

411001–411100 

|-bgcolor=#d6d6d6
| 411001 ||  || — || October 22, 2009 || Mount Lemmon || Mount Lemmon Survey || — || align=right | 3.1 km || 
|-id=002 bgcolor=#d6d6d6
| 411002 ||  || — || October 23, 2009 || Mount Lemmon || Mount Lemmon Survey || — || align=right | 2.5 km || 
|-id=003 bgcolor=#d6d6d6
| 411003 ||  || — || January 7, 2006 || Kitt Peak || Spacewatch || KOR || align=right | 1.5 km || 
|-id=004 bgcolor=#d6d6d6
| 411004 ||  || — || October 17, 2009 || Mount Lemmon || Mount Lemmon Survey || — || align=right | 3.6 km || 
|-id=005 bgcolor=#d6d6d6
| 411005 ||  || — || October 21, 2009 || Mount Lemmon || Mount Lemmon Survey || — || align=right | 3.3 km || 
|-id=006 bgcolor=#d6d6d6
| 411006 ||  || — || September 29, 2009 || Mount Lemmon || Mount Lemmon Survey || EOS || align=right | 1.5 km || 
|-id=007 bgcolor=#d6d6d6
| 411007 ||  || — || September 18, 2009 || Mount Lemmon || Mount Lemmon Survey || — || align=right | 4.0 km || 
|-id=008 bgcolor=#d6d6d6
| 411008 ||  || — || September 27, 2009 || Mount Lemmon || Mount Lemmon Survey || — || align=right | 3.1 km || 
|-id=009 bgcolor=#d6d6d6
| 411009 ||  || — || December 28, 1994 || Kitt Peak || Spacewatch || — || align=right | 2.9 km || 
|-id=010 bgcolor=#d6d6d6
| 411010 ||  || — || October 22, 2009 || Mount Lemmon || Mount Lemmon Survey || EOS || align=right | 2.3 km || 
|-id=011 bgcolor=#d6d6d6
| 411011 ||  || — || October 23, 2009 || Kitt Peak || Spacewatch || — || align=right | 3.4 km || 
|-id=012 bgcolor=#d6d6d6
| 411012 ||  || — || September 18, 2009 || Mount Lemmon || Mount Lemmon Survey ||  || align=right | 3.9 km || 
|-id=013 bgcolor=#E9E9E9
| 411013 ||  || — || October 24, 2009 || Mount Lemmon || Mount Lemmon Survey || — || align=right | 2.3 km || 
|-id=014 bgcolor=#d6d6d6
| 411014 ||  || — || October 23, 2009 || Socorro || LINEAR || — || align=right | 2.7 km || 
|-id=015 bgcolor=#d6d6d6
| 411015 ||  || — || April 18, 2007 || Mount Lemmon || Mount Lemmon Survey || EOS || align=right | 2.1 km || 
|-id=016 bgcolor=#d6d6d6
| 411016 ||  || — || October 22, 2009 || Mount Lemmon || Mount Lemmon Survey || — || align=right | 2.6 km || 
|-id=017 bgcolor=#d6d6d6
| 411017 ||  || — || October 23, 2009 || Mount Lemmon || Mount Lemmon Survey || — || align=right | 3.8 km || 
|-id=018 bgcolor=#d6d6d6
| 411018 ||  || — || September 22, 2009 || Mount Lemmon || Mount Lemmon Survey || — || align=right | 2.5 km || 
|-id=019 bgcolor=#d6d6d6
| 411019 ||  || — || October 23, 2009 || Mount Lemmon || Mount Lemmon Survey || — || align=right | 2.6 km || 
|-id=020 bgcolor=#d6d6d6
| 411020 ||  || — || October 23, 2009 || Mount Lemmon || Mount Lemmon Survey || — || align=right | 2.9 km || 
|-id=021 bgcolor=#d6d6d6
| 411021 ||  || — || September 21, 2009 || Mount Lemmon || Mount Lemmon Survey || — || align=right | 3.1 km || 
|-id=022 bgcolor=#d6d6d6
| 411022 ||  || — || October 21, 2009 || Mount Lemmon || Mount Lemmon Survey || EOS || align=right | 2.0 km || 
|-id=023 bgcolor=#d6d6d6
| 411023 ||  || — || October 21, 2009 || Mount Lemmon || Mount Lemmon Survey || — || align=right | 4.3 km || 
|-id=024 bgcolor=#d6d6d6
| 411024 ||  || — || October 21, 2009 || Mount Lemmon || Mount Lemmon Survey || EMA || align=right | 4.3 km || 
|-id=025 bgcolor=#d6d6d6
| 411025 ||  || — || October 23, 2009 || Kitt Peak || Spacewatch || EOS || align=right | 1.9 km || 
|-id=026 bgcolor=#d6d6d6
| 411026 ||  || — || September 22, 2009 || Mount Lemmon || Mount Lemmon Survey || — || align=right | 2.8 km || 
|-id=027 bgcolor=#d6d6d6
| 411027 ||  || — || October 23, 2009 || Kitt Peak || Spacewatch || — || align=right | 3.1 km || 
|-id=028 bgcolor=#d6d6d6
| 411028 ||  || — || October 23, 2009 || Kitt Peak || Spacewatch || — || align=right | 3.3 km || 
|-id=029 bgcolor=#d6d6d6
| 411029 ||  || — || April 22, 2007 || Mount Lemmon || Mount Lemmon Survey || EMA || align=right | 3.4 km || 
|-id=030 bgcolor=#d6d6d6
| 411030 ||  || — || October 14, 2009 || XuYi || PMO NEO || — || align=right | 4.1 km || 
|-id=031 bgcolor=#d6d6d6
| 411031 ||  || — || September 15, 2009 || Kitt Peak || Spacewatch || EOS || align=right | 1.6 km || 
|-id=032 bgcolor=#d6d6d6
| 411032 ||  || — || October 26, 2009 || Mount Lemmon || Mount Lemmon Survey || — || align=right | 3.3 km || 
|-id=033 bgcolor=#d6d6d6
| 411033 ||  || — || October 20, 2009 || Socorro || LINEAR || — || align=right | 3.7 km || 
|-id=034 bgcolor=#d6d6d6
| 411034 ||  || — || October 29, 2009 || Bisei SG Center || BATTeRS || — || align=right | 4.1 km || 
|-id=035 bgcolor=#d6d6d6
| 411035 ||  || — || October 16, 2009 || Socorro || LINEAR || — || align=right | 2.3 km || 
|-id=036 bgcolor=#d6d6d6
| 411036 ||  || — || October 17, 2009 || Catalina || CSS || — || align=right | 3.9 km || 
|-id=037 bgcolor=#d6d6d6
| 411037 ||  || — || October 24, 2009 || Catalina || CSS || — || align=right | 5.2 km || 
|-id=038 bgcolor=#d6d6d6
| 411038 ||  || — || October 27, 2009 || Catalina || CSS || TIR || align=right | 2.6 km || 
|-id=039 bgcolor=#d6d6d6
| 411039 ||  || — || October 26, 2009 || Kitt Peak || Spacewatch || — || align=right | 3.0 km || 
|-id=040 bgcolor=#d6d6d6
| 411040 ||  || — || October 18, 2009 || Mount Lemmon || Mount Lemmon Survey || VER || align=right | 2.9 km || 
|-id=041 bgcolor=#d6d6d6
| 411041 ||  || — || October 16, 2009 || Catalina || CSS || — || align=right | 4.9 km || 
|-id=042 bgcolor=#d6d6d6
| 411042 ||  || — || October 18, 2009 || Mount Lemmon || Mount Lemmon Survey || — || align=right | 2.7 km || 
|-id=043 bgcolor=#d6d6d6
| 411043 ||  || — || October 24, 2009 || Catalina || CSS || — || align=right | 2.8 km || 
|-id=044 bgcolor=#d6d6d6
| 411044 ||  || — || October 21, 2009 || Mount Lemmon || Mount Lemmon Survey || EOS || align=right | 2.4 km || 
|-id=045 bgcolor=#d6d6d6
| 411045 ||  || — || November 8, 2009 || Mount Lemmon || Mount Lemmon Survey || — || align=right | 2.8 km || 
|-id=046 bgcolor=#d6d6d6
| 411046 ||  || — || November 8, 2009 || Mount Lemmon || Mount Lemmon Survey || THM || align=right | 2.1 km || 
|-id=047 bgcolor=#d6d6d6
| 411047 ||  || — || November 9, 2009 || Mount Lemmon || Mount Lemmon Survey || — || align=right | 2.6 km || 
|-id=048 bgcolor=#d6d6d6
| 411048 ||  || — || November 9, 2009 || Mount Lemmon || Mount Lemmon Survey || EOS || align=right | 2.4 km || 
|-id=049 bgcolor=#d6d6d6
| 411049 ||  || — || November 10, 2009 || Dauban || F. Kugel || EOS || align=right | 2.2 km || 
|-id=050 bgcolor=#d6d6d6
| 411050 ||  || — || October 30, 2009 || Mount Lemmon || Mount Lemmon Survey || — || align=right | 2.0 km || 
|-id=051 bgcolor=#d6d6d6
| 411051 ||  || — || November 8, 2009 || Catalina || CSS || EOS || align=right | 2.4 km || 
|-id=052 bgcolor=#d6d6d6
| 411052 ||  || — || November 9, 2009 || Catalina || CSS || — || align=right | 2.4 km || 
|-id=053 bgcolor=#d6d6d6
| 411053 ||  || — || November 9, 2009 || Mount Lemmon || Mount Lemmon Survey || THM || align=right | 1.6 km || 
|-id=054 bgcolor=#d6d6d6
| 411054 ||  || — || November 9, 2009 || Kitt Peak || Spacewatch || — || align=right | 2.0 km || 
|-id=055 bgcolor=#d6d6d6
| 411055 ||  || — || November 12, 2009 || La Sagra || OAM Obs. || — || align=right | 3.5 km || 
|-id=056 bgcolor=#d6d6d6
| 411056 ||  || — || November 14, 2009 || Mayhill || A. Lowe || — || align=right | 4.9 km || 
|-id=057 bgcolor=#d6d6d6
| 411057 ||  || — || October 24, 2009 || Kitt Peak || Spacewatch || — || align=right | 2.3 km || 
|-id=058 bgcolor=#d6d6d6
| 411058 ||  || — || November 9, 2009 || Mount Lemmon || Mount Lemmon Survey || — || align=right | 2.2 km || 
|-id=059 bgcolor=#d6d6d6
| 411059 ||  || — || November 11, 2009 || La Sagra || OAM Obs. || — || align=right | 2.9 km || 
|-id=060 bgcolor=#d6d6d6
| 411060 ||  || — || November 11, 2009 || La Sagra || OAM Obs. || — || align=right | 3.1 km || 
|-id=061 bgcolor=#d6d6d6
| 411061 ||  || — || November 10, 2009 || Kitt Peak || Spacewatch || — || align=right | 4.2 km || 
|-id=062 bgcolor=#d6d6d6
| 411062 ||  || — || November 10, 2009 || Mount Lemmon || Mount Lemmon Survey || — || align=right | 5.3 km || 
|-id=063 bgcolor=#d6d6d6
| 411063 ||  || — || November 15, 2009 || Catalina || CSS || — || align=right | 2.6 km || 
|-id=064 bgcolor=#d6d6d6
| 411064 ||  || — || November 8, 2009 || Catalina || CSS || — || align=right | 2.6 km || 
|-id=065 bgcolor=#d6d6d6
| 411065 ||  || — || October 23, 2009 || Mount Lemmon || Mount Lemmon Survey || — || align=right | 2.8 km || 
|-id=066 bgcolor=#d6d6d6
| 411066 ||  || — || November 8, 2009 || Kitt Peak || Spacewatch || — || align=right | 3.3 km || 
|-id=067 bgcolor=#d6d6d6
| 411067 ||  || — || November 8, 2009 || Kitt Peak || Spacewatch || — || align=right | 3.9 km || 
|-id=068 bgcolor=#d6d6d6
| 411068 ||  || — || November 8, 2009 || Kitt Peak || Spacewatch || — || align=right | 2.3 km || 
|-id=069 bgcolor=#d6d6d6
| 411069 ||  || — || September 23, 2009 || Kitt Peak || Spacewatch || EOS || align=right | 2.1 km || 
|-id=070 bgcolor=#d6d6d6
| 411070 ||  || — || November 9, 2009 || Kitt Peak || Spacewatch || — || align=right | 4.7 km || 
|-id=071 bgcolor=#d6d6d6
| 411071 ||  || — || November 9, 2009 || Kitt Peak || Spacewatch || EOS || align=right | 2.1 km || 
|-id=072 bgcolor=#d6d6d6
| 411072 ||  || — || November 9, 2009 || Kitt Peak || Spacewatch || critical || align=right | 1.9 km || 
|-id=073 bgcolor=#d6d6d6
| 411073 ||  || — || November 9, 2009 || Kitt Peak || Spacewatch || — || align=right | 2.2 km || 
|-id=074 bgcolor=#d6d6d6
| 411074 ||  || — || October 17, 2009 || Mount Lemmon || Mount Lemmon Survey || — || align=right | 4.6 km || 
|-id=075 bgcolor=#d6d6d6
| 411075 ||  || — || November 15, 2009 || Catalina || CSS || — || align=right | 3.7 km || 
|-id=076 bgcolor=#d6d6d6
| 411076 ||  || — || October 14, 2009 || Catalina || CSS || — || align=right | 3.0 km || 
|-id=077 bgcolor=#d6d6d6
| 411077 ||  || — || November 8, 2009 || Kitt Peak || Spacewatch || — || align=right | 3.0 km || 
|-id=078 bgcolor=#d6d6d6
| 411078 ||  || — || October 17, 2009 || Mount Lemmon || Mount Lemmon Survey || 7:4 || align=right | 4.2 km || 
|-id=079 bgcolor=#d6d6d6
| 411079 ||  || — || September 21, 2003 || Kitt Peak || Spacewatch || — || align=right | 2.7 km || 
|-id=080 bgcolor=#d6d6d6
| 411080 ||  || — || October 26, 2009 || Mount Lemmon || Mount Lemmon Survey || — || align=right | 2.6 km || 
|-id=081 bgcolor=#d6d6d6
| 411081 ||  || — || November 11, 2009 || Kitt Peak || Spacewatch || EOS || align=right | 3.2 km || 
|-id=082 bgcolor=#d6d6d6
| 411082 ||  || — || October 15, 2009 || Kitt Peak || Spacewatch || EOS || align=right | 1.8 km || 
|-id=083 bgcolor=#d6d6d6
| 411083 ||  || — || October 26, 2009 || Mount Lemmon || Mount Lemmon Survey || — || align=right | 2.9 km || 
|-id=084 bgcolor=#d6d6d6
| 411084 ||  || — || March 25, 2006 || Kitt Peak || Spacewatch || — || align=right | 2.5 km || 
|-id=085 bgcolor=#d6d6d6
| 411085 ||  || — || November 9, 2009 || Mount Lemmon || Mount Lemmon Survey || — || align=right | 3.6 km || 
|-id=086 bgcolor=#d6d6d6
| 411086 ||  || — || November 9, 2009 || Mount Lemmon || Mount Lemmon Survey || — || align=right | 3.5 km || 
|-id=087 bgcolor=#fefefe
| 411087 ||  || — || September 21, 2009 || Mount Lemmon || Mount Lemmon Survey || H || align=right data-sort-value="0.82" | 820 m || 
|-id=088 bgcolor=#d6d6d6
| 411088 ||  || — || November 10, 2009 || Kitt Peak || Spacewatch || — || align=right | 6.6 km || 
|-id=089 bgcolor=#d6d6d6
| 411089 ||  || — || November 11, 2009 || La Sagra || OAM Obs. || — || align=right | 3.5 km || 
|-id=090 bgcolor=#d6d6d6
| 411090 ||  || — || November 9, 2009 || Catalina || CSS || — || align=right | 3.3 km || 
|-id=091 bgcolor=#d6d6d6
| 411091 ||  || — || November 9, 2009 || Mount Lemmon || Mount Lemmon Survey || HYG || align=right | 2.6 km || 
|-id=092 bgcolor=#d6d6d6
| 411092 ||  || — || September 15, 2009 || Kitt Peak || Spacewatch || — || align=right | 2.5 km || 
|-id=093 bgcolor=#d6d6d6
| 411093 ||  || — || September 15, 2009 || Kitt Peak || Spacewatch || — || align=right | 2.5 km || 
|-id=094 bgcolor=#d6d6d6
| 411094 ||  || — || November 18, 2009 || Saint-Sulpice || B. Christophe || — || align=right | 3.6 km || 
|-id=095 bgcolor=#d6d6d6
| 411095 ||  || — || November 23, 2009 || Mayhill || A. Lowe || — || align=right | 3.0 km || 
|-id=096 bgcolor=#d6d6d6
| 411096 ||  || — || October 12, 1998 || Kitt Peak || Spacewatch || THM || align=right | 1.9 km || 
|-id=097 bgcolor=#d6d6d6
| 411097 ||  || — || October 26, 2009 || Kitt Peak || Spacewatch || — || align=right | 3.6 km || 
|-id=098 bgcolor=#d6d6d6
| 411098 ||  || — || November 16, 2009 || Kitt Peak || Spacewatch || 7:4 || align=right | 5.2 km || 
|-id=099 bgcolor=#d6d6d6
| 411099 ||  || — || November 8, 2009 || Kitt Peak || Spacewatch || — || align=right | 4.0 km || 
|-id=100 bgcolor=#d6d6d6
| 411100 ||  || — || November 17, 2009 || Kitt Peak || Spacewatch || INA || align=right | 3.2 km || 
|}

411101–411200 

|-bgcolor=#d6d6d6
| 411101 ||  || — || October 26, 2009 || Mount Lemmon || Mount Lemmon Survey || Tj (2.99) || align=right | 4.6 km || 
|-id=102 bgcolor=#d6d6d6
| 411102 ||  || — || November 17, 2009 || Kitt Peak || Spacewatch || — || align=right | 4.1 km || 
|-id=103 bgcolor=#d6d6d6
| 411103 ||  || — || November 17, 2009 || Mount Lemmon || Mount Lemmon Survey || — || align=right | 2.7 km || 
|-id=104 bgcolor=#d6d6d6
| 411104 ||  || — || November 17, 2009 || Kitt Peak || Spacewatch || — || align=right | 4.2 km || 
|-id=105 bgcolor=#d6d6d6
| 411105 ||  || — || November 19, 2009 || Mount Lemmon || Mount Lemmon Survey || — || align=right | 3.3 km || 
|-id=106 bgcolor=#d6d6d6
| 411106 ||  || — || October 1, 2009 || Mount Lemmon || Mount Lemmon Survey || — || align=right | 3.3 km || 
|-id=107 bgcolor=#d6d6d6
| 411107 ||  || — || November 20, 2009 || Mount Lemmon || Mount Lemmon Survey || — || align=right | 4.0 km || 
|-id=108 bgcolor=#d6d6d6
| 411108 ||  || — || November 18, 2009 || Kitt Peak || Spacewatch || — || align=right | 1.9 km || 
|-id=109 bgcolor=#d6d6d6
| 411109 ||  || — || November 18, 2009 || Kitt Peak || Spacewatch || — || align=right | 3.6 km || 
|-id=110 bgcolor=#d6d6d6
| 411110 ||  || — || November 18, 2009 || Kitt Peak || Spacewatch || — || align=right | 2.4 km || 
|-id=111 bgcolor=#d6d6d6
| 411111 ||  || — || February 14, 2005 || Kitt Peak || Spacewatch || — || align=right | 2.9 km || 
|-id=112 bgcolor=#d6d6d6
| 411112 ||  || — || December 25, 2005 || Kitt Peak || Spacewatch || — || align=right | 2.2 km || 
|-id=113 bgcolor=#d6d6d6
| 411113 ||  || — || November 19, 2009 || Kitt Peak || Spacewatch || — || align=right | 3.6 km || 
|-id=114 bgcolor=#d6d6d6
| 411114 ||  || — || September 6, 2008 || Mount Lemmon || Mount Lemmon Survey || — || align=right | 2.6 km || 
|-id=115 bgcolor=#d6d6d6
| 411115 ||  || — || November 8, 2009 || Kitt Peak || Spacewatch || EMA || align=right | 4.3 km || 
|-id=116 bgcolor=#d6d6d6
| 411116 ||  || — || November 17, 2009 || Mount Lemmon || Mount Lemmon Survey || EOS || align=right | 1.6 km || 
|-id=117 bgcolor=#d6d6d6
| 411117 ||  || — || October 22, 2003 || Socorro || LINEAR || — || align=right | 3.8 km || 
|-id=118 bgcolor=#d6d6d6
| 411118 ||  || — || September 22, 2009 || Mount Lemmon || Mount Lemmon Survey || — || align=right | 3.3 km || 
|-id=119 bgcolor=#d6d6d6
| 411119 ||  || — || November 9, 2009 || Kitt Peak || Spacewatch || HYG || align=right | 2.8 km || 
|-id=120 bgcolor=#d6d6d6
| 411120 ||  || — || November 22, 2009 || Catalina || CSS || — || align=right | 3.7 km || 
|-id=121 bgcolor=#d6d6d6
| 411121 ||  || — || November 19, 2009 || Kitt Peak || Spacewatch || — || align=right | 3.0 km || 
|-id=122 bgcolor=#d6d6d6
| 411122 ||  || — || November 20, 2009 || La Sagra || OAM Obs. || — || align=right | 3.4 km || 
|-id=123 bgcolor=#d6d6d6
| 411123 ||  || — || November 21, 2009 || Kitt Peak || Spacewatch || — || align=right | 3.1 km || 
|-id=124 bgcolor=#d6d6d6
| 411124 ||  || — || November 22, 2009 || Mount Lemmon || Mount Lemmon Survey || — || align=right | 3.8 km || 
|-id=125 bgcolor=#d6d6d6
| 411125 ||  || — || September 22, 2003 || Kitt Peak || Spacewatch || THM || align=right | 1.8 km || 
|-id=126 bgcolor=#d6d6d6
| 411126 ||  || — || November 24, 2009 || Mount Lemmon || Mount Lemmon Survey || — || align=right | 3.5 km || 
|-id=127 bgcolor=#d6d6d6
| 411127 ||  || — || September 22, 2009 || Mount Lemmon || Mount Lemmon Survey || — || align=right | 3.0 km || 
|-id=128 bgcolor=#d6d6d6
| 411128 ||  || — || March 16, 2007 || Mount Lemmon || Mount Lemmon Survey || — || align=right | 3.7 km || 
|-id=129 bgcolor=#d6d6d6
| 411129 ||  || — || November 17, 2009 || Kitt Peak || Spacewatch || — || align=right | 2.3 km || 
|-id=130 bgcolor=#d6d6d6
| 411130 ||  || — || November 17, 2009 || Catalina || CSS || — || align=right | 4.3 km || 
|-id=131 bgcolor=#d6d6d6
| 411131 ||  || — || August 21, 2003 || Campo Imperatore || CINEOS || EOS || align=right | 2.2 km || 
|-id=132 bgcolor=#d6d6d6
| 411132 ||  || — || November 18, 2009 || Mount Lemmon || Mount Lemmon Survey || — || align=right | 2.9 km || 
|-id=133 bgcolor=#d6d6d6
| 411133 ||  || — || November 16, 2009 || Kitt Peak || Spacewatch || — || align=right | 4.6 km || 
|-id=134 bgcolor=#d6d6d6
| 411134 ||  || — || November 16, 2009 || Mount Lemmon || Mount Lemmon Survey || — || align=right | 3.0 km || 
|-id=135 bgcolor=#d6d6d6
| 411135 ||  || — || November 16, 2009 || Mount Lemmon || Mount Lemmon Survey || — || align=right | 2.9 km || 
|-id=136 bgcolor=#d6d6d6
| 411136 ||  || — || September 18, 2009 || Mount Lemmon || Mount Lemmon Survey || — || align=right | 2.7 km || 
|-id=137 bgcolor=#d6d6d6
| 411137 ||  || — || November 17, 2009 || Mount Lemmon || Mount Lemmon Survey || — || align=right | 5.0 km || 
|-id=138 bgcolor=#d6d6d6
| 411138 ||  || — || November 17, 2009 || Kitt Peak || Spacewatch || — || align=right | 3.3 km || 
|-id=139 bgcolor=#d6d6d6
| 411139 ||  || — || November 17, 2009 || Catalina || CSS || — || align=right | 4.2 km || 
|-id=140 bgcolor=#d6d6d6
| 411140 ||  || — || November 17, 2009 || Kitt Peak || Spacewatch || — || align=right | 3.2 km || 
|-id=141 bgcolor=#d6d6d6
| 411141 ||  || — || November 27, 2009 || Kitt Peak || Spacewatch || — || align=right | 2.6 km || 
|-id=142 bgcolor=#d6d6d6
| 411142 ||  || — || November 23, 2009 || Mount Lemmon || Mount Lemmon Survey || — || align=right | 2.9 km || 
|-id=143 bgcolor=#d6d6d6
| 411143 ||  || — || December 6, 2009 || Bisei SG Center || BATTeRS || THM || align=right | 2.8 km || 
|-id=144 bgcolor=#d6d6d6
| 411144 ||  || — || December 12, 2009 || Tzec Maun || Tzec Maun Obs. || — || align=right | 2.5 km || 
|-id=145 bgcolor=#fefefe
| 411145 ||  || — || October 27, 2005 || Kitt Peak || Spacewatch || — || align=right | 1.0 km || 
|-id=146 bgcolor=#d6d6d6
| 411146 ||  || — || September 22, 2009 || Mount Lemmon || Mount Lemmon Survey || — || align=right | 4.0 km || 
|-id=147 bgcolor=#d6d6d6
| 411147 ||  || — || November 21, 2009 || Mount Lemmon || Mount Lemmon Survey || — || align=right | 2.3 km || 
|-id=148 bgcolor=#d6d6d6
| 411148 ||  || — || October 15, 2009 || Mount Lemmon || Mount Lemmon Survey || — || align=right | 2.4 km || 
|-id=149 bgcolor=#d6d6d6
| 411149 ||  || — || December 16, 2009 || Mount Lemmon || Mount Lemmon Survey || — || align=right | 4.6 km || 
|-id=150 bgcolor=#d6d6d6
| 411150 ||  || — || January 4, 2010 || Kitt Peak || Spacewatch || — || align=right | 2.9 km || 
|-id=151 bgcolor=#d6d6d6
| 411151 ||  || — || November 26, 2003 || Kitt Peak || Spacewatch || EOS || align=right | 2.4 km || 
|-id=152 bgcolor=#d6d6d6
| 411152 ||  || — || January 6, 2010 || Socorro || LINEAR || — || align=right | 5.1 km || 
|-id=153 bgcolor=#d6d6d6
| 411153 ||  || — || September 30, 2009 || Mount Lemmon || Mount Lemmon Survey || — || align=right | 3.2 km || 
|-id=154 bgcolor=#d6d6d6
| 411154 ||  || — || September 18, 2009 || Kitt Peak || Spacewatch || — || align=right | 5.1 km || 
|-id=155 bgcolor=#d6d6d6
| 411155 ||  || — || January 13, 2010 || WISE || WISE || — || align=right | 3.8 km || 
|-id=156 bgcolor=#d6d6d6
| 411156 ||  || — || September 29, 2009 || Mount Lemmon || Mount Lemmon Survey || — || align=right | 3.3 km || 
|-id=157 bgcolor=#d6d6d6
| 411157 ||  || — || January 15, 2010 || WISE || WISE || — || align=right | 2.4 km || 
|-id=158 bgcolor=#d6d6d6
| 411158 ||  || — || September 21, 2009 || Mount Lemmon || Mount Lemmon Survey || — || align=right | 5.1 km || 
|-id=159 bgcolor=#d6d6d6
| 411159 ||  || — || January 24, 2010 || Moletai || K. Černis, J. Zdanavičius || — || align=right | 4.4 km || 
|-id=160 bgcolor=#d6d6d6
| 411160 ||  || — || January 18, 2010 || WISE || WISE || — || align=right | 2.9 km || 
|-id=161 bgcolor=#d6d6d6
| 411161 ||  || — || March 2, 2006 || Kitt Peak || Spacewatch || — || align=right | 3.6 km || 
|-id=162 bgcolor=#d6d6d6
| 411162 ||  || — || January 27, 2010 || WISE || WISE || — || align=right | 3.6 km || 
|-id=163 bgcolor=#d6d6d6
| 411163 ||  || — || April 20, 2007 || Kitt Peak || Spacewatch || — || align=right | 2.6 km || 
|-id=164 bgcolor=#fefefe
| 411164 ||  || — || October 8, 2008 || Mount Lemmon || Mount Lemmon Survey || — || align=right data-sort-value="0.94" | 940 m || 
|-id=165 bgcolor=#FFC2E0
| 411165 ||  || — || February 17, 2010 || Kitt Peak || Spacewatch || APOPHA || align=right data-sort-value="0.16" | 160 m || 
|-id=166 bgcolor=#fefefe
| 411166 ||  || — || February 16, 2010 || WISE || WISE || — || align=right | 1.5 km || 
|-id=167 bgcolor=#d6d6d6
| 411167 ||  || — || May 3, 2006 || Kitt Peak || Spacewatch || — || align=right | 4.2 km || 
|-id=168 bgcolor=#d6d6d6
| 411168 ||  || — || September 29, 1997 || Kitt Peak || Spacewatch || — || align=right | 3.7 km || 
|-id=169 bgcolor=#fefefe
| 411169 ||  || — || February 14, 2010 || Mount Lemmon || Mount Lemmon Survey || H || align=right data-sort-value="0.54" | 540 m || 
|-id=170 bgcolor=#FA8072
| 411170 ||  || — || April 15, 2007 || Catalina || CSS || — || align=right data-sort-value="0.73" | 730 m || 
|-id=171 bgcolor=#fefefe
| 411171 ||  || — || March 12, 2010 || Kitt Peak || Spacewatch || — || align=right data-sort-value="0.81" | 810 m || 
|-id=172 bgcolor=#fefefe
| 411172 ||  || — || March 12, 2010 || Kitt Peak || Spacewatch || — || align=right data-sort-value="0.79" | 790 m || 
|-id=173 bgcolor=#fefefe
| 411173 ||  || — || March 15, 2010 || Mount Lemmon || Mount Lemmon Survey || — || align=right data-sort-value="0.60" | 600 m || 
|-id=174 bgcolor=#fefefe
| 411174 ||  || — || March 18, 2010 || Kitt Peak || Spacewatch || — || align=right data-sort-value="0.75" | 750 m || 
|-id=175 bgcolor=#d6d6d6
| 411175 ||  || — || March 8, 2005 || Catalina || CSS || — || align=right | 5.1 km || 
|-id=176 bgcolor=#fefefe
| 411176 ||  || — || March 21, 2010 || Kitt Peak || Spacewatch || — || align=right data-sort-value="0.54" | 540 m || 
|-id=177 bgcolor=#d6d6d6
| 411177 ||  || — || March 15, 2010 || Kitt Peak || Spacewatch || — || align=right | 2.7 km || 
|-id=178 bgcolor=#fefefe
| 411178 ||  || — || March 19, 2010 || Kitt Peak || Spacewatch || — || align=right data-sort-value="0.77" | 770 m || 
|-id=179 bgcolor=#fefefe
| 411179 ||  || — || April 8, 2010 || Mount Lemmon || Mount Lemmon Survey || — || align=right data-sort-value="0.62" | 620 m || 
|-id=180 bgcolor=#fefefe
| 411180 ||  || — || April 10, 2010 || Mount Lemmon || Mount Lemmon Survey || — || align=right data-sort-value="0.65" | 650 m || 
|-id=181 bgcolor=#fefefe
| 411181 ||  || — || January 27, 2006 || Kitt Peak || Spacewatch || — || align=right data-sort-value="0.68" | 680 m || 
|-id=182 bgcolor=#fefefe
| 411182 ||  || — || April 18, 2007 || Mount Lemmon || Mount Lemmon Survey || — || align=right data-sort-value="0.62" | 620 m || 
|-id=183 bgcolor=#fefefe
| 411183 ||  || — || April 11, 2010 || Kitt Peak || Spacewatch || — || align=right data-sort-value="0.70" | 700 m || 
|-id=184 bgcolor=#fefefe
| 411184 ||  || — || April 17, 2010 || WISE || WISE || — || align=right | 2.3 km || 
|-id=185 bgcolor=#fefefe
| 411185 ||  || — || April 24, 2010 || WISE || WISE || — || align=right | 1.5 km || 
|-id=186 bgcolor=#fefefe
| 411186 ||  || — || May 4, 2010 || Kitt Peak || Spacewatch || — || align=right | 1.0 km || 
|-id=187 bgcolor=#FA8072
| 411187 ||  || — || January 30, 2006 || Kitt Peak || Spacewatch || — || align=right data-sort-value="0.75" | 750 m || 
|-id=188 bgcolor=#E9E9E9
| 411188 ||  || — || April 8, 2010 || Kitt Peak || Spacewatch || — || align=right | 1.2 km || 
|-id=189 bgcolor=#fefefe
| 411189 ||  || — || May 7, 2010 || Kitt Peak || Spacewatch || — || align=right data-sort-value="0.80" | 800 m || 
|-id=190 bgcolor=#fefefe
| 411190 ||  || — || May 9, 2010 || WISE || WISE || — || align=right | 2.0 km || 
|-id=191 bgcolor=#fefefe
| 411191 ||  || — || May 6, 2010 || Mount Lemmon || Mount Lemmon Survey || — || align=right data-sort-value="0.58" | 580 m || 
|-id=192 bgcolor=#fefefe
| 411192 ||  || — || May 7, 2010 || Mount Lemmon || Mount Lemmon Survey || — || align=right data-sort-value="0.88" | 880 m || 
|-id=193 bgcolor=#fefefe
| 411193 ||  || — || January 27, 2010 || WISE || WISE || — || align=right | 1.2 km || 
|-id=194 bgcolor=#fefefe
| 411194 ||  || — || May 5, 2010 || La Sagra || OAM Obs. || — || align=right | 1.2 km || 
|-id=195 bgcolor=#fefefe
| 411195 ||  || — || May 16, 2010 || WISE || WISE || — || align=right | 1.6 km || 
|-id=196 bgcolor=#fefefe
| 411196 ||  || — || May 21, 2010 || WISE || WISE || — || align=right | 1.6 km || 
|-id=197 bgcolor=#fefefe
| 411197 ||  || — || May 29, 2010 || WISE || WISE || — || align=right | 1.9 km || 
|-id=198 bgcolor=#E9E9E9
| 411198 ||  || — || May 30, 2010 || WISE || WISE || — || align=right | 1.9 km || 
|-id=199 bgcolor=#FA8072
| 411199 ||  || — || May 19, 2010 || Catalina || CSS || — || align=right data-sort-value="0.90" | 900 m || 
|-id=200 bgcolor=#fefefe
| 411200 ||  || — || May 17, 2010 || Nogales || Tenagra II Obs. || — || align=right data-sort-value="0.99" | 990 m || 
|}

411201–411300 

|-bgcolor=#FFC2E0
| 411201 ||  || — || June 5, 2010 || Kitt Peak || Spacewatch || AMO +1kmslow || align=right data-sort-value="0.66" | 660 m || 
|-id=202 bgcolor=#E9E9E9
| 411202 ||  || — || June 3, 2010 || WISE || WISE || — || align=right | 3.2 km || 
|-id=203 bgcolor=#E9E9E9
| 411203 ||  || — || June 5, 2010 || Kitt Peak || Spacewatch || — || align=right | 1.7 km || 
|-id=204 bgcolor=#E9E9E9
| 411204 ||  || — || June 8, 2010 || WISE || WISE || — || align=right | 3.8 km || 
|-id=205 bgcolor=#E9E9E9
| 411205 ||  || — || June 11, 2010 || WISE || WISE || JUN || align=right | 1.5 km || 
|-id=206 bgcolor=#fefefe
| 411206 ||  || — || May 7, 2010 || Mount Lemmon || Mount Lemmon Survey || — || align=right data-sort-value="0.87" | 870 m || 
|-id=207 bgcolor=#fefefe
| 411207 ||  || — || June 11, 2010 || Mount Lemmon || Mount Lemmon Survey || — || align=right data-sort-value="0.86" | 860 m || 
|-id=208 bgcolor=#fefefe
| 411208 ||  || — || August 30, 2006 || Anderson Mesa || LONEOS || NYS || align=right | 1.9 km || 
|-id=209 bgcolor=#E9E9E9
| 411209 ||  || — || October 4, 2006 || Mount Lemmon || Mount Lemmon Survey || — || align=right | 1.7 km || 
|-id=210 bgcolor=#fefefe
| 411210 ||  || — || July 7, 2010 || Kitt Peak || Spacewatch || — || align=right data-sort-value="0.77" | 770 m || 
|-id=211 bgcolor=#E9E9E9
| 411211 ||  || — || July 1, 2010 || WISE || WISE || — || align=right | 2.7 km || 
|-id=212 bgcolor=#E9E9E9
| 411212 ||  || — || July 6, 2010 || WISE || WISE || — || align=right | 3.1 km || 
|-id=213 bgcolor=#E9E9E9
| 411213 ||  || — || August 1, 1997 || Caussols || ODAS || — || align=right | 3.4 km || 
|-id=214 bgcolor=#E9E9E9
| 411214 ||  || — || July 11, 2010 || WISE || WISE || ADE || align=right | 2.0 km || 
|-id=215 bgcolor=#E9E9E9
| 411215 ||  || — || July 14, 2010 || WISE || WISE || — || align=right | 1.5 km || 
|-id=216 bgcolor=#E9E9E9
| 411216 ||  || — || November 10, 2006 || Kitt Peak || Spacewatch || critical || align=right | 1.7 km || 
|-id=217 bgcolor=#E9E9E9
| 411217 ||  || — || November 18, 2006 || Catalina || CSS || (194) || align=right | 2.7 km || 
|-id=218 bgcolor=#E9E9E9
| 411218 ||  || — || July 12, 2010 || WISE || WISE || — || align=right | 2.7 km || 
|-id=219 bgcolor=#E9E9E9
| 411219 ||  || — || July 17, 2010 || WISE || WISE || — || align=right | 3.0 km || 
|-id=220 bgcolor=#E9E9E9
| 411220 ||  || — || October 21, 2006 || Kitt Peak || Spacewatch || — || align=right | 2.1 km || 
|-id=221 bgcolor=#E9E9E9
| 411221 ||  || — || July 19, 2010 || WISE || WISE || ADE || align=right | 2.6 km || 
|-id=222 bgcolor=#E9E9E9
| 411222 ||  || — || October 20, 2006 || Mount Lemmon || Mount Lemmon Survey || — || align=right | 2.1 km || 
|-id=223 bgcolor=#E9E9E9
| 411223 ||  || — || November 17, 2006 || Mount Lemmon || Mount Lemmon Survey || ADE || align=right | 1.9 km || 
|-id=224 bgcolor=#E9E9E9
| 411224 ||  || — || October 30, 2006 || Catalina || CSS || — || align=right | 2.4 km || 
|-id=225 bgcolor=#fefefe
| 411225 ||  || — || January 28, 2010 || WISE || WISE || — || align=right | 2.2 km || 
|-id=226 bgcolor=#E9E9E9
| 411226 ||  || — || November 20, 2006 || Catalina || CSS || — || align=right | 2.9 km || 
|-id=227 bgcolor=#E9E9E9
| 411227 ||  || — || July 29, 2010 || WISE || WISE || — || align=right | 2.0 km || 
|-id=228 bgcolor=#fefefe
| 411228 ||  || — || October 18, 2003 || Kitt Peak || Spacewatch || — || align=right data-sort-value="0.90" | 900 m || 
|-id=229 bgcolor=#E9E9E9
| 411229 ||  || — || March 28, 2008 || Mount Lemmon || Mount Lemmon Survey || — || align=right | 2.5 km || 
|-id=230 bgcolor=#E9E9E9
| 411230 ||  || — || June 18, 2010 || Mount Lemmon || Mount Lemmon Survey || — || align=right | 2.4 km || 
|-id=231 bgcolor=#fefefe
| 411231 ||  || — || August 3, 2010 || La Sagra || OAM Obs. || — || align=right | 1.2 km || 
|-id=232 bgcolor=#fefefe
| 411232 ||  || — || August 10, 2010 || Kitt Peak || Spacewatch || — || align=right | 1.2 km || 
|-id=233 bgcolor=#fefefe
| 411233 ||  || — || August 10, 2010 || Kitt Peak || Spacewatch || — || align=right data-sort-value="0.76" | 760 m || 
|-id=234 bgcolor=#E9E9E9
| 411234 ||  || — || August 10, 2010 || Kitt Peak || Spacewatch || KON || align=right | 2.4 km || 
|-id=235 bgcolor=#fefefe
| 411235 ||  || — || August 10, 2010 || Kitt Peak || Spacewatch || NYS || align=right data-sort-value="0.71" | 710 m || 
|-id=236 bgcolor=#fefefe
| 411236 ||  || — || August 13, 2010 || Kitt Peak || Spacewatch || — || align=right data-sort-value="0.89" | 890 m || 
|-id=237 bgcolor=#fefefe
| 411237 ||  || — || August 12, 2010 || Kitt Peak || Spacewatch || — || align=right data-sort-value="0.78" | 780 m || 
|-id=238 bgcolor=#fefefe
| 411238 ||  || — || March 3, 2009 || Mount Lemmon || Mount Lemmon Survey || — || align=right | 1.0 km || 
|-id=239 bgcolor=#fefefe
| 411239 ||  || — || August 20, 2010 || La Sagra || OAM Obs. || — || align=right data-sort-value="0.94" | 940 m || 
|-id=240 bgcolor=#fefefe
| 411240 ||  || — || June 20, 2010 || Mount Lemmon || Mount Lemmon Survey || NYS || align=right data-sort-value="0.74" | 740 m || 
|-id=241 bgcolor=#E9E9E9
| 411241 ||  || — || September 3, 2010 || Mount Lemmon || Mount Lemmon Survey || — || align=right | 1.1 km || 
|-id=242 bgcolor=#fefefe
| 411242 ||  || — || December 21, 2007 || Mount Lemmon || Mount Lemmon Survey || — || align=right | 1.2 km || 
|-id=243 bgcolor=#fefefe
| 411243 ||  || — || September 3, 2010 || Piszkéstető || K. Sárneczky, Z. Kuli || — || align=right data-sort-value="0.87" | 870 m || 
|-id=244 bgcolor=#E9E9E9
| 411244 ||  || — || September 6, 2010 || Kitt Peak || Spacewatch || — || align=right | 1.2 km || 
|-id=245 bgcolor=#fefefe
| 411245 ||  || — || July 21, 2006 || Catalina || CSS || — || align=right | 1.1 km || 
|-id=246 bgcolor=#fefefe
| 411246 ||  || — || November 14, 1995 || Kitt Peak || Spacewatch || NYS || align=right data-sort-value="0.63" | 630 m || 
|-id=247 bgcolor=#E9E9E9
| 411247 ||  || — || October 18, 2006 || Kitt Peak || Spacewatch || (5) || align=right data-sort-value="0.81" | 810 m || 
|-id=248 bgcolor=#fefefe
| 411248 ||  || — || December 17, 2003 || Kitt Peak || Spacewatch || — || align=right data-sort-value="0.92" | 920 m || 
|-id=249 bgcolor=#fefefe
| 411249 ||  || — || April 30, 2005 || Kitt Peak || Spacewatch || V || align=right data-sort-value="0.76" | 760 m || 
|-id=250 bgcolor=#fefefe
| 411250 ||  || — || September 2, 2010 || Mount Lemmon || Mount Lemmon Survey || — || align=right data-sort-value="0.77" | 770 m || 
|-id=251 bgcolor=#fefefe
| 411251 ||  || — || March 28, 2009 || Kitt Peak || Spacewatch || — || align=right data-sort-value="0.91" | 910 m || 
|-id=252 bgcolor=#E9E9E9
| 411252 ||  || — || August 13, 2010 || Kitt Peak || Spacewatch || EUN || align=right data-sort-value="0.95" | 950 m || 
|-id=253 bgcolor=#E9E9E9
| 411253 ||  || — || April 18, 2009 || Mount Lemmon || Mount Lemmon Survey || EUN || align=right data-sort-value="0.92" | 920 m || 
|-id=254 bgcolor=#fefefe
| 411254 ||  || — || March 9, 2005 || Mount Lemmon || Mount Lemmon Survey || — || align=right data-sort-value="0.94" | 940 m || 
|-id=255 bgcolor=#E9E9E9
| 411255 ||  || — || September 19, 2006 || Kitt Peak || Spacewatch || EUN || align=right data-sort-value="0.96" | 960 m || 
|-id=256 bgcolor=#fefefe
| 411256 ||  || — || March 1, 2008 || Mount Lemmon || Mount Lemmon Survey || — || align=right | 1.0 km || 
|-id=257 bgcolor=#E9E9E9
| 411257 ||  || — || July 5, 2005 || Kitt Peak || Spacewatch || — || align=right | 1.5 km || 
|-id=258 bgcolor=#E9E9E9
| 411258 ||  || — || September 11, 2010 || Catalina || CSS || — || align=right | 1.3 km || 
|-id=259 bgcolor=#fefefe
| 411259 ||  || — || May 3, 2005 || Kitt Peak || Spacewatch || — || align=right data-sort-value="0.76" | 760 m || 
|-id=260 bgcolor=#E9E9E9
| 411260 ||  || — || September 10, 2010 || Kitt Peak || Spacewatch || — || align=right | 1.6 km || 
|-id=261 bgcolor=#E9E9E9
| 411261 ||  || — || September 11, 2010 || Kitt Peak || Spacewatch || — || align=right | 1.6 km || 
|-id=262 bgcolor=#fefefe
| 411262 ||  || — || August 18, 2006 || Kitt Peak || Spacewatch || — || align=right data-sort-value="0.62" | 620 m || 
|-id=263 bgcolor=#E9E9E9
| 411263 ||  || — || September 12, 2010 || Kitt Peak || Spacewatch || — || align=right data-sort-value="0.86" | 860 m || 
|-id=264 bgcolor=#E9E9E9
| 411264 ||  || — || September 14, 2010 || Kitt Peak || Spacewatch || — || align=right | 1.2 km || 
|-id=265 bgcolor=#fefefe
| 411265 ||  || — || August 13, 2010 || Kitt Peak || Spacewatch || — || align=right data-sort-value="0.69" | 690 m || 
|-id=266 bgcolor=#fefefe
| 411266 ||  || — || May 30, 2006 || Mount Lemmon || Mount Lemmon Survey || NYS || align=right data-sort-value="0.72" | 720 m || 
|-id=267 bgcolor=#E9E9E9
| 411267 ||  || — || October 20, 2006 || Kitt Peak || Spacewatch || — || align=right | 1.2 km || 
|-id=268 bgcolor=#E9E9E9
| 411268 ||  || — || September 25, 2006 || Kitt Peak || Spacewatch || — || align=right | 1.7 km || 
|-id=269 bgcolor=#E9E9E9
| 411269 ||  || — || October 3, 2006 || Mount Lemmon || Mount Lemmon Survey || — || align=right data-sort-value="0.93" | 930 m || 
|-id=270 bgcolor=#E9E9E9
| 411270 ||  || — || May 9, 2005 || Kitt Peak || Spacewatch || — || align=right data-sort-value="0.94" | 940 m || 
|-id=271 bgcolor=#E9E9E9
| 411271 ||  || — || September 28, 2006 || Catalina || CSS || — || align=right | 1.1 km || 
|-id=272 bgcolor=#E9E9E9
| 411272 ||  || — || September 16, 2006 || Catalina || CSS || — || align=right data-sort-value="0.78" | 780 m || 
|-id=273 bgcolor=#E9E9E9
| 411273 ||  || — || September 9, 2010 || Kitt Peak || Spacewatch || — || align=right | 1.2 km || 
|-id=274 bgcolor=#E9E9E9
| 411274 ||  || — || September 26, 2006 || Kitt Peak || Spacewatch || (5) || align=right data-sort-value="0.61" | 610 m || 
|-id=275 bgcolor=#E9E9E9
| 411275 ||  || — || April 5, 2000 || Anderson Mesa || LONEOS || — || align=right | 1.4 km || 
|-id=276 bgcolor=#E9E9E9
| 411276 ||  || — || September 16, 2010 || Mount Lemmon || Mount Lemmon Survey || — || align=right | 1.4 km || 
|-id=277 bgcolor=#E9E9E9
| 411277 ||  || — || September 16, 2010 || Mount Lemmon || Mount Lemmon Survey || — || align=right | 1.4 km || 
|-id=278 bgcolor=#E9E9E9
| 411278 ||  || — || August 6, 2010 || Kitt Peak || Spacewatch || — || align=right | 2.2 km || 
|-id=279 bgcolor=#E9E9E9
| 411279 ||  || — || September 18, 2010 || Mount Lemmon || Mount Lemmon Survey || — || align=right | 1.8 km || 
|-id=280 bgcolor=#FFC2E0
| 411280 ||  || — || September 19, 2010 || Kitt Peak || Spacewatch || AMO || align=right data-sort-value="0.49" | 490 m || 
|-id=281 bgcolor=#fefefe
| 411281 ||  || — || March 13, 2005 || Kitt Peak || Spacewatch || — || align=right | 1.1 km || 
|-id=282 bgcolor=#E9E9E9
| 411282 ||  || — || November 2, 2006 || Mount Lemmon || Mount Lemmon Survey || — || align=right | 1.5 km || 
|-id=283 bgcolor=#E9E9E9
| 411283 ||  || — || September 28, 2006 || Mount Lemmon || Mount Lemmon Survey || — || align=right | 1.3 km || 
|-id=284 bgcolor=#E9E9E9
| 411284 ||  || — || April 15, 2008 || Mount Lemmon || Mount Lemmon Survey || — || align=right | 1.6 km || 
|-id=285 bgcolor=#fefefe
| 411285 ||  || — || February 2, 2008 || Mount Lemmon || Mount Lemmon Survey || — || align=right data-sort-value="0.84" | 840 m || 
|-id=286 bgcolor=#E9E9E9
| 411286 ||  || — || May 17, 2009 || Mount Lemmon || Mount Lemmon Survey || — || align=right data-sort-value="0.92" | 920 m || 
|-id=287 bgcolor=#E9E9E9
| 411287 ||  || — || September 16, 2010 || Catalina || CSS || — || align=right | 1.7 km || 
|-id=288 bgcolor=#E9E9E9
| 411288 ||  || — || February 10, 2008 || Kitt Peak || Spacewatch || — || align=right data-sort-value="0.93" | 930 m || 
|-id=289 bgcolor=#E9E9E9
| 411289 ||  || — || July 12, 2010 || WISE || WISE || — || align=right | 2.5 km || 
|-id=290 bgcolor=#E9E9E9
| 411290 ||  || — || March 4, 2008 || Kitt Peak || Spacewatch || — || align=right data-sort-value="0.90" | 900 m || 
|-id=291 bgcolor=#E9E9E9
| 411291 ||  || — || October 3, 2010 || Kitt Peak || Spacewatch || — || align=right | 1.8 km || 
|-id=292 bgcolor=#E9E9E9
| 411292 ||  || — || September 10, 2010 || Mount Lemmon || Mount Lemmon Survey || — || align=right | 1.1 km || 
|-id=293 bgcolor=#E9E9E9
| 411293 ||  || — || September 2, 2010 || Mount Lemmon || Mount Lemmon Survey || — || align=right data-sort-value="0.99" | 990 m || 
|-id=294 bgcolor=#E9E9E9
| 411294 ||  || — || October 3, 2006 || Mount Lemmon || Mount Lemmon Survey || — || align=right | 1.7 km || 
|-id=295 bgcolor=#E9E9E9
| 411295 ||  || — || November 1, 2006 || Kitt Peak || Spacewatch || (5) || align=right data-sort-value="0.59" | 590 m || 
|-id=296 bgcolor=#E9E9E9
| 411296 ||  || — || September 30, 2006 || Mount Lemmon || Mount Lemmon Survey || — || align=right | 1.0 km || 
|-id=297 bgcolor=#E9E9E9
| 411297 ||  || — || October 4, 2006 || Mount Lemmon || Mount Lemmon Survey || — || align=right | 1.0 km || 
|-id=298 bgcolor=#E9E9E9
| 411298 ||  || — || September 19, 2006 || Kitt Peak || Spacewatch || — || align=right data-sort-value="0.90" | 900 m || 
|-id=299 bgcolor=#E9E9E9
| 411299 ||  || — || September 17, 2006 || Kitt Peak || Spacewatch || — || align=right data-sort-value="0.74" | 740 m || 
|-id=300 bgcolor=#fefefe
| 411300 ||  || — || April 19, 2009 || Mount Lemmon || Mount Lemmon Survey || — || align=right data-sort-value="0.98" | 980 m || 
|}

411301–411400 

|-bgcolor=#fefefe
| 411301 ||  || — || September 19, 2010 || Kitt Peak || Spacewatch || — || align=right data-sort-value="0.82" | 820 m || 
|-id=302 bgcolor=#E9E9E9
| 411302 ||  || — || October 23, 2006 || Kitt Peak || Spacewatch || — || align=right | 1.5 km || 
|-id=303 bgcolor=#E9E9E9
| 411303 ||  || — || September 30, 2006 || Mount Lemmon || Mount Lemmon Survey || EUN || align=right | 1.1 km || 
|-id=304 bgcolor=#E9E9E9
| 411304 ||  || — || April 13, 2004 || Kitt Peak || Spacewatch || — || align=right | 1.9 km || 
|-id=305 bgcolor=#E9E9E9
| 411305 ||  || — || October 9, 2010 || Mount Lemmon || Mount Lemmon Survey || — || align=right | 1.5 km || 
|-id=306 bgcolor=#E9E9E9
| 411306 ||  || — || November 18, 2006 || Kitt Peak || Spacewatch || — || align=right | 1.7 km || 
|-id=307 bgcolor=#E9E9E9
| 411307 ||  || — || October 3, 2006 || Mount Lemmon || Mount Lemmon Survey || — || align=right data-sort-value="0.98" | 980 m || 
|-id=308 bgcolor=#E9E9E9
| 411308 ||  || — || September 17, 2010 || Mount Lemmon || Mount Lemmon Survey || — || align=right | 2.1 km || 
|-id=309 bgcolor=#E9E9E9
| 411309 ||  || — || October 11, 2010 || Mount Lemmon || Mount Lemmon Survey || — || align=right | 2.8 km || 
|-id=310 bgcolor=#E9E9E9
| 411310 ||  || — || October 4, 2006 || Mount Lemmon || Mount Lemmon Survey || — || align=right data-sort-value="0.65" | 650 m || 
|-id=311 bgcolor=#E9E9E9
| 411311 ||  || — || November 17, 2006 || Kitt Peak || Spacewatch || — || align=right | 1.1 km || 
|-id=312 bgcolor=#E9E9E9
| 411312 ||  || — || November 19, 2001 || Socorro || LINEAR || HOF || align=right | 2.4 km || 
|-id=313 bgcolor=#E9E9E9
| 411313 ||  || — || May 18, 2009 || Mount Lemmon || Mount Lemmon Survey || — || align=right | 2.0 km || 
|-id=314 bgcolor=#fefefe
| 411314 ||  || — || December 4, 2007 || Kitt Peak || Spacewatch || — || align=right data-sort-value="0.79" | 790 m || 
|-id=315 bgcolor=#FA8072
| 411315 ||  || — || April 9, 2003 || Kitt Peak || Spacewatch || — || align=right | 1.6 km || 
|-id=316 bgcolor=#E9E9E9
| 411316 ||  || — || September 17, 2010 || Mount Lemmon || Mount Lemmon Survey || (5) || align=right data-sort-value="0.78" | 780 m || 
|-id=317 bgcolor=#fefefe
| 411317 ||  || — || February 12, 2004 || Kitt Peak || Spacewatch || NYS || align=right data-sort-value="0.54" | 540 m || 
|-id=318 bgcolor=#E9E9E9
| 411318 ||  || — || September 18, 2010 || Mount Lemmon || Mount Lemmon Survey || — || align=right | 1.4 km || 
|-id=319 bgcolor=#E9E9E9
| 411319 ||  || — || October 4, 2006 || Mount Lemmon || Mount Lemmon Survey || — || align=right data-sort-value="0.99" | 990 m || 
|-id=320 bgcolor=#E9E9E9
| 411320 ||  || — || April 27, 2009 || Kitt Peak || Spacewatch || — || align=right | 1.8 km || 
|-id=321 bgcolor=#E9E9E9
| 411321 ||  || — || March 6, 2008 || Mount Lemmon || Mount Lemmon Survey || — || align=right | 1.7 km || 
|-id=322 bgcolor=#E9E9E9
| 411322 ||  || — || September 17, 2010 || Mount Lemmon || Mount Lemmon Survey || EUN || align=right | 1.4 km || 
|-id=323 bgcolor=#E9E9E9
| 411323 ||  || — || October 17, 2010 || Mount Lemmon || Mount Lemmon Survey || (5) || align=right data-sort-value="0.93" | 930 m || 
|-id=324 bgcolor=#E9E9E9
| 411324 ||  || — || October 8, 2010 || Catalina || CSS || — || align=right | 1.5 km || 
|-id=325 bgcolor=#E9E9E9
| 411325 ||  || — || December 26, 2006 || Kitt Peak || Spacewatch || — || align=right | 1.6 km || 
|-id=326 bgcolor=#E9E9E9
| 411326 ||  || — || September 27, 2006 || Mount Lemmon || Mount Lemmon Survey || (5) || align=right data-sort-value="0.85" | 850 m || 
|-id=327 bgcolor=#E9E9E9
| 411327 ||  || — || November 20, 2006 || Kitt Peak || Spacewatch || — || align=right | 1.5 km || 
|-id=328 bgcolor=#E9E9E9
| 411328 ||  || — || December 27, 2006 || Kitt Peak || Spacewatch || — || align=right | 1.2 km || 
|-id=329 bgcolor=#E9E9E9
| 411329 ||  || — || September 30, 2006 || Mount Lemmon || Mount Lemmon Survey || HNS || align=right | 1.1 km || 
|-id=330 bgcolor=#E9E9E9
| 411330 ||  || — || November 17, 2006 || Kitt Peak || Spacewatch || (5) || align=right data-sort-value="0.81" | 810 m || 
|-id=331 bgcolor=#E9E9E9
| 411331 ||  || — || October 21, 2006 || Mount Lemmon || Mount Lemmon Survey || EUN || align=right | 1.4 km || 
|-id=332 bgcolor=#E9E9E9
| 411332 ||  || — || October 29, 2010 || Mount Lemmon || Mount Lemmon Survey || BRG || align=right | 2.2 km || 
|-id=333 bgcolor=#E9E9E9
| 411333 ||  || — || September 10, 2005 || Anderson Mesa || LONEOS || — || align=right | 2.7 km || 
|-id=334 bgcolor=#E9E9E9
| 411334 ||  || — || August 24, 2001 || Kitt Peak || Spacewatch || — || align=right | 1.2 km || 
|-id=335 bgcolor=#E9E9E9
| 411335 ||  || — || October 28, 2010 || Mount Lemmon || Mount Lemmon Survey || — || align=right | 2.4 km || 
|-id=336 bgcolor=#E9E9E9
| 411336 ||  || — || October 4, 2006 || Mount Lemmon || Mount Lemmon Survey || — || align=right | 2.1 km || 
|-id=337 bgcolor=#E9E9E9
| 411337 ||  || — || October 29, 2010 || Kitt Peak || Spacewatch || — || align=right | 1.8 km || 
|-id=338 bgcolor=#E9E9E9
| 411338 ||  || — || December 26, 2006 || Catalina || CSS || — || align=right | 2.4 km || 
|-id=339 bgcolor=#E9E9E9
| 411339 ||  || — || July 14, 2010 || WISE || WISE || — || align=right | 1.9 km || 
|-id=340 bgcolor=#d6d6d6
| 411340 ||  || — || October 29, 2010 || Kitt Peak || Spacewatch || EOS || align=right | 2.4 km || 
|-id=341 bgcolor=#E9E9E9
| 411341 ||  || — || October 29, 2010 || Kitt Peak || Spacewatch || — || align=right | 1.7 km || 
|-id=342 bgcolor=#E9E9E9
| 411342 ||  || — || August 24, 2001 || Kitt Peak || Spacewatch || — || align=right | 1.1 km || 
|-id=343 bgcolor=#E9E9E9
| 411343 ||  || — || March 5, 2008 || Kitt Peak || Spacewatch || — || align=right | 1.7 km || 
|-id=344 bgcolor=#E9E9E9
| 411344 ||  || — || November 15, 2006 || Kitt Peak || Spacewatch || — || align=right data-sort-value="0.86" | 860 m || 
|-id=345 bgcolor=#E9E9E9
| 411345 ||  || — || October 1, 2005 || Kitt Peak || Spacewatch || — || align=right | 2.5 km || 
|-id=346 bgcolor=#E9E9E9
| 411346 ||  || — || October 29, 2010 || Catalina || CSS || — || align=right | 1.3 km || 
|-id=347 bgcolor=#E9E9E9
| 411347 ||  || — || September 16, 2010 || Catalina || CSS || — || align=right | 1.6 km || 
|-id=348 bgcolor=#E9E9E9
| 411348 ||  || — || December 31, 2002 || Socorro || LINEAR || — || align=right | 1.9 km || 
|-id=349 bgcolor=#E9E9E9
| 411349 ||  || — || October 7, 2005 || Kitt Peak || Spacewatch || — || align=right | 1.9 km || 
|-id=350 bgcolor=#E9E9E9
| 411350 ||  || — || August 19, 2006 || Kitt Peak || Spacewatch || — || align=right | 1.2 km || 
|-id=351 bgcolor=#E9E9E9
| 411351 ||  || — || October 30, 2010 || Catalina || CSS || EUN || align=right | 1.3 km || 
|-id=352 bgcolor=#E9E9E9
| 411352 ||  || — || October 30, 2010 || Kitt Peak || Spacewatch || — || align=right | 1.1 km || 
|-id=353 bgcolor=#E9E9E9
| 411353 ||  || — || November 18, 2006 || Kitt Peak || Spacewatch || — || align=right data-sort-value="0.81" | 810 m || 
|-id=354 bgcolor=#E9E9E9
| 411354 ||  || — || February 13, 2008 || Mount Lemmon || Mount Lemmon Survey || (5) || align=right data-sort-value="0.85" | 850 m || 
|-id=355 bgcolor=#E9E9E9
| 411355 ||  || — || October 29, 2010 || Kitt Peak || Spacewatch || — || align=right | 1.4 km || 
|-id=356 bgcolor=#E9E9E9
| 411356 ||  || — || October 9, 2010 || Catalina || CSS || ADE || align=right | 2.1 km || 
|-id=357 bgcolor=#E9E9E9
| 411357 ||  || — || April 30, 2009 || Mount Lemmon || Mount Lemmon Survey || — || align=right | 2.4 km || 
|-id=358 bgcolor=#E9E9E9
| 411358 ||  || — || April 14, 2004 || Kitt Peak || Spacewatch || — || align=right | 1.9 km || 
|-id=359 bgcolor=#E9E9E9
| 411359 ||  || — || October 18, 2006 || Kitt Peak || Spacewatch || — || align=right data-sort-value="0.71" | 710 m || 
|-id=360 bgcolor=#E9E9E9
| 411360 ||  || — || August 12, 2010 || Kitt Peak || Spacewatch || — || align=right | 1.6 km || 
|-id=361 bgcolor=#E9E9E9
| 411361 ||  || — || September 27, 2006 || Mount Lemmon || Mount Lemmon Survey || critical || align=right | 1.1 km || 
|-id=362 bgcolor=#E9E9E9
| 411362 ||  || — || October 13, 2010 || Mount Lemmon || Mount Lemmon Survey || — || align=right | 1.7 km || 
|-id=363 bgcolor=#E9E9E9
| 411363 ||  || — || January 10, 2003 || Socorro || LINEAR || — || align=right | 1.6 km || 
|-id=364 bgcolor=#E9E9E9
| 411364 ||  || — || December 14, 2001 || Socorro || LINEAR || AEO || align=right | 1.2 km || 
|-id=365 bgcolor=#E9E9E9
| 411365 ||  || — || October 31, 2010 || Mount Lemmon || Mount Lemmon Survey || — || align=right | 2.6 km || 
|-id=366 bgcolor=#E9E9E9
| 411366 ||  || — || September 11, 2010 || Mount Lemmon || Mount Lemmon Survey || — || align=right | 1.8 km || 
|-id=367 bgcolor=#E9E9E9
| 411367 ||  || — || February 13, 2008 || Kitt Peak || Spacewatch || (5) || align=right data-sort-value="0.84" | 840 m || 
|-id=368 bgcolor=#E9E9E9
| 411368 ||  || — || November 1, 2010 || Catalina || CSS || — || align=right | 1.7 km || 
|-id=369 bgcolor=#E9E9E9
| 411369 ||  || — || September 16, 2010 || Mount Lemmon || Mount Lemmon Survey || (5) || align=right data-sort-value="0.85" | 850 m || 
|-id=370 bgcolor=#E9E9E9
| 411370 ||  || — || May 29, 2009 || Mount Lemmon || Mount Lemmon Survey || EUN || align=right | 1.3 km || 
|-id=371 bgcolor=#fefefe
| 411371 ||  || — || November 1, 1999 || Kitt Peak || Spacewatch || — || align=right data-sort-value="0.89" | 890 m || 
|-id=372 bgcolor=#E9E9E9
| 411372 ||  || — || May 11, 2008 || Kitt Peak || Spacewatch || — || align=right | 1.8 km || 
|-id=373 bgcolor=#d6d6d6
| 411373 ||  || — || November 2, 2010 || Kitt Peak || Spacewatch || — || align=right | 2.7 km || 
|-id=374 bgcolor=#E9E9E9
| 411374 ||  || — || September 1, 2005 || Kitt Peak || Spacewatch || — || align=right | 1.8 km || 
|-id=375 bgcolor=#E9E9E9
| 411375 ||  || — || November 12, 2001 || Socorro || LINEAR || — || align=right | 2.2 km || 
|-id=376 bgcolor=#E9E9E9
| 411376 ||  || — || November 3, 2010 || Mount Lemmon || Mount Lemmon Survey || DOR || align=right | 2.5 km || 
|-id=377 bgcolor=#E9E9E9
| 411377 ||  || — || December 9, 2006 || Kitt Peak || Spacewatch || — || align=right | 1.5 km || 
|-id=378 bgcolor=#E9E9E9
| 411378 ||  || — || December 12, 2006 || Mount Lemmon || Mount Lemmon Survey || — || align=right | 1.9 km || 
|-id=379 bgcolor=#E9E9E9
| 411379 ||  || — || December 24, 2006 || Kitt Peak || Spacewatch || — || align=right | 1.3 km || 
|-id=380 bgcolor=#E9E9E9
| 411380 ||  || — || September 20, 2001 || Kitt Peak || Spacewatch || — || align=right | 1.3 km || 
|-id=381 bgcolor=#FA8072
| 411381 ||  || — || April 24, 2003 || Kitt Peak || Spacewatch || — || align=right | 1.9 km || 
|-id=382 bgcolor=#E9E9E9
| 411382 ||  || — || November 11, 2006 || Mount Lemmon || Mount Lemmon Survey || (5) || align=right data-sort-value="0.74" | 740 m || 
|-id=383 bgcolor=#E9E9E9
| 411383 ||  || — || November 22, 2006 || Kitt Peak || Spacewatch || critical || align=right | 1.3 km || 
|-id=384 bgcolor=#E9E9E9
| 411384 ||  || — || November 5, 2010 || Catalina || CSS || — || align=right | 1.2 km || 
|-id=385 bgcolor=#E9E9E9
| 411385 ||  || — || January 24, 2007 || Kitt Peak || Spacewatch || AEO || align=right | 1.0 km || 
|-id=386 bgcolor=#E9E9E9
| 411386 ||  || — || November 17, 2006 || Mount Lemmon || Mount Lemmon Survey || — || align=right data-sort-value="0.94" | 940 m || 
|-id=387 bgcolor=#E9E9E9
| 411387 ||  || — || October 5, 2005 || Mount Lemmon || Mount Lemmon Survey || — || align=right | 2.3 km || 
|-id=388 bgcolor=#E9E9E9
| 411388 ||  || — || November 24, 2006 || Mount Lemmon || Mount Lemmon Survey || — || align=right | 1.3 km || 
|-id=389 bgcolor=#E9E9E9
| 411389 ||  || — || October 13, 2010 || Mount Lemmon || Mount Lemmon Survey || — || align=right | 1.1 km || 
|-id=390 bgcolor=#E9E9E9
| 411390 ||  || — || January 10, 2003 || Socorro || LINEAR || — || align=right | 1.1 km || 
|-id=391 bgcolor=#E9E9E9
| 411391 ||  || — || September 26, 2005 || Kitt Peak || Spacewatch || — || align=right | 1.9 km || 
|-id=392 bgcolor=#E9E9E9
| 411392 ||  || — || November 7, 2010 || Mount Lemmon || Mount Lemmon Survey || — || align=right | 1.9 km || 
|-id=393 bgcolor=#E9E9E9
| 411393 ||  || — || November 2, 2010 || Mount Lemmon || Mount Lemmon Survey || — || align=right | 1.6 km || 
|-id=394 bgcolor=#E9E9E9
| 411394 ||  || — || January 27, 2007 || Kitt Peak || Spacewatch || — || align=right | 1.4 km || 
|-id=395 bgcolor=#E9E9E9
| 411395 ||  || — || November 17, 2001 || Kitt Peak || Spacewatch || — || align=right | 2.8 km || 
|-id=396 bgcolor=#E9E9E9
| 411396 ||  || — || October 28, 2010 || Mount Lemmon || Mount Lemmon Survey || — || align=right | 2.3 km || 
|-id=397 bgcolor=#E9E9E9
| 411397 ||  || — || April 3, 2008 || Mount Lemmon || Mount Lemmon Survey || — || align=right | 1.5 km || 
|-id=398 bgcolor=#E9E9E9
| 411398 ||  || — || October 28, 2010 || Mount Lemmon || Mount Lemmon Survey || — || align=right | 1.9 km || 
|-id=399 bgcolor=#E9E9E9
| 411399 ||  || — || October 15, 2001 || Socorro || LINEAR || HNS || align=right | 1.9 km || 
|-id=400 bgcolor=#E9E9E9
| 411400 ||  || — || September 5, 2010 || Mount Lemmon || Mount Lemmon Survey || (5) || align=right data-sort-value="0.82" | 820 m || 
|}

411401–411500 

|-bgcolor=#E9E9E9
| 411401 ||  || — || December 26, 2006 || Kitt Peak || Spacewatch || — || align=right data-sort-value="0.94" | 940 m || 
|-id=402 bgcolor=#d6d6d6
| 411402 ||  || — || October 30, 2010 || Kitt Peak || Spacewatch || — || align=right | 2.8 km || 
|-id=403 bgcolor=#E9E9E9
| 411403 ||  || — || October 30, 2010 || Kitt Peak || Spacewatch || ADE || align=right | 2.4 km || 
|-id=404 bgcolor=#E9E9E9
| 411404 ||  || — || January 10, 2007 || Mount Lemmon || Mount Lemmon Survey || — || align=right | 1.5 km || 
|-id=405 bgcolor=#E9E9E9
| 411405 ||  || — || October 29, 2010 || Mount Lemmon || Mount Lemmon Survey || — || align=right | 1.5 km || 
|-id=406 bgcolor=#E9E9E9
| 411406 ||  || — || October 17, 2010 || Mount Lemmon || Mount Lemmon Survey || — || align=right | 1.5 km || 
|-id=407 bgcolor=#E9E9E9
| 411407 ||  || — || October 19, 2010 || Mount Lemmon || Mount Lemmon Survey || — || align=right data-sort-value="0.77" | 770 m || 
|-id=408 bgcolor=#E9E9E9
| 411408 ||  || — || July 10, 2005 || Kitt Peak || Spacewatch || — || align=right | 1.2 km || 
|-id=409 bgcolor=#E9E9E9
| 411409 ||  || — || December 1, 2006 || Kitt Peak || Spacewatch || (5) || align=right data-sort-value="0.94" | 940 m || 
|-id=410 bgcolor=#E9E9E9
| 411410 ||  || — || November 8, 2010 || Mount Lemmon || Mount Lemmon Survey || — || align=right | 2.0 km || 
|-id=411 bgcolor=#E9E9E9
| 411411 ||  || — || March 31, 2008 || Kitt Peak || Spacewatch || — || align=right | 1.3 km || 
|-id=412 bgcolor=#E9E9E9
| 411412 ||  || — || August 24, 2001 || Kitt Peak || Spacewatch || — || align=right | 1.4 km || 
|-id=413 bgcolor=#E9E9E9
| 411413 ||  || — || November 1, 2010 || Kitt Peak || Spacewatch || — || align=right | 2.1 km || 
|-id=414 bgcolor=#E9E9E9
| 411414 ||  || — || November 1, 2010 || Kitt Peak || Spacewatch || — || align=right | 2.8 km || 
|-id=415 bgcolor=#E9E9E9
| 411415 ||  || — || September 11, 2010 || Mount Lemmon || Mount Lemmon Survey || — || align=right | 1.2 km || 
|-id=416 bgcolor=#E9E9E9
| 411416 ||  || — || July 11, 2005 || Mount Lemmon || Mount Lemmon Survey || — || align=right | 1.9 km || 
|-id=417 bgcolor=#E9E9E9
| 411417 ||  || — || October 30, 2010 || Kitt Peak || Spacewatch || — || align=right | 1.3 km || 
|-id=418 bgcolor=#E9E9E9
| 411418 ||  || — || November 2, 2010 || Mount Lemmon || Mount Lemmon Survey || — || align=right | 1.3 km || 
|-id=419 bgcolor=#E9E9E9
| 411419 ||  || — || June 30, 2005 || Kitt Peak || Spacewatch || — || align=right | 2.1 km || 
|-id=420 bgcolor=#E9E9E9
| 411420 ||  || — || September 30, 1997 || Kitt Peak || Spacewatch || — || align=right | 1.4 km || 
|-id=421 bgcolor=#E9E9E9
| 411421 ||  || — || November 12, 2010 || Mount Lemmon || Mount Lemmon Survey || — || align=right | 1.2 km || 
|-id=422 bgcolor=#E9E9E9
| 411422 ||  || — || November 14, 2006 || Catalina || CSS || — || align=right | 1.4 km || 
|-id=423 bgcolor=#E9E9E9
| 411423 ||  || — || March 8, 2008 || Kitt Peak || Spacewatch || WIT || align=right data-sort-value="0.95" | 950 m || 
|-id=424 bgcolor=#E9E9E9
| 411424 ||  || — || November 20, 2006 || Kitt Peak || Spacewatch || — || align=right | 1.3 km || 
|-id=425 bgcolor=#E9E9E9
| 411425 ||  || — || October 17, 2010 || Mount Lemmon || Mount Lemmon Survey || — || align=right | 1.8 km || 
|-id=426 bgcolor=#E9E9E9
| 411426 ||  || — || October 4, 2006 || Mount Lemmon || Mount Lemmon Survey || — || align=right data-sort-value="0.91" | 910 m || 
|-id=427 bgcolor=#E9E9E9
| 411427 ||  || — || April 3, 2008 || Mount Lemmon || Mount Lemmon Survey || MAR || align=right data-sort-value="0.82" | 820 m || 
|-id=428 bgcolor=#E9E9E9
| 411428 ||  || — || November 17, 2006 || Kitt Peak || Spacewatch || MAR || align=right | 1.7 km || 
|-id=429 bgcolor=#E9E9E9
| 411429 ||  || — || March 29, 2008 || Kitt Peak || Spacewatch || — || align=right | 1.8 km || 
|-id=430 bgcolor=#E9E9E9
| 411430 ||  || — || April 28, 2004 || Kitt Peak || Spacewatch || WIT || align=right data-sort-value="0.95" | 950 m || 
|-id=431 bgcolor=#E9E9E9
| 411431 ||  || — || September 28, 2006 || Mount Lemmon || Mount Lemmon Survey || — || align=right data-sort-value="0.83" | 830 m || 
|-id=432 bgcolor=#E9E9E9
| 411432 ||  || — || October 10, 2005 || Catalina || CSS || WAT || align=right | 2.2 km || 
|-id=433 bgcolor=#E9E9E9
| 411433 ||  || — || January 28, 2007 || Mount Lemmon || Mount Lemmon Survey || MRX || align=right | 1.0 km || 
|-id=434 bgcolor=#E9E9E9
| 411434 ||  || — || December 27, 2006 || Mount Lemmon || Mount Lemmon Survey || — || align=right | 1.7 km || 
|-id=435 bgcolor=#E9E9E9
| 411435 ||  || — || November 23, 2006 || Mount Lemmon || Mount Lemmon Survey || — || align=right | 2.4 km || 
|-id=436 bgcolor=#E9E9E9
| 411436 ||  || — || November 13, 2010 || Kitt Peak || Spacewatch || — || align=right | 1.8 km || 
|-id=437 bgcolor=#E9E9E9
| 411437 ||  || — || November 10, 2010 || Mount Lemmon || Mount Lemmon Survey || — || align=right | 1.9 km || 
|-id=438 bgcolor=#E9E9E9
| 411438 ||  || — || December 26, 2006 || Kitt Peak || Spacewatch || — || align=right | 2.2 km || 
|-id=439 bgcolor=#E9E9E9
| 411439 ||  || — || December 27, 2006 || Mount Lemmon || Mount Lemmon Survey || NEM || align=right | 2.2 km || 
|-id=440 bgcolor=#E9E9E9
| 411440 ||  || — || September 19, 2001 || Socorro || LINEAR || — || align=right | 1.6 km || 
|-id=441 bgcolor=#E9E9E9
| 411441 ||  || — || October 1, 2005 || Kitt Peak || Spacewatch || — || align=right | 2.0 km || 
|-id=442 bgcolor=#E9E9E9
| 411442 ||  || — || October 9, 2005 || Kitt Peak || Spacewatch || — || align=right | 2.1 km || 
|-id=443 bgcolor=#E9E9E9
| 411443 ||  || — || October 31, 2010 || Kitt Peak || Spacewatch || — || align=right | 2.0 km || 
|-id=444 bgcolor=#E9E9E9
| 411444 ||  || — || November 1, 2010 || Kitt Peak || Spacewatch || — || align=right | 1.6 km || 
|-id=445 bgcolor=#E9E9E9
| 411445 ||  || — || October 6, 2005 || Kitt Peak || Spacewatch || HOF || align=right | 2.3 km || 
|-id=446 bgcolor=#d6d6d6
| 411446 ||  || — || November 29, 2005 || Mount Lemmon || Mount Lemmon Survey || — || align=right | 2.5 km || 
|-id=447 bgcolor=#E9E9E9
| 411447 ||  || — || November 12, 2010 || Kitt Peak || Spacewatch || EUN || align=right | 1.4 km || 
|-id=448 bgcolor=#d6d6d6
| 411448 ||  || — || October 24, 2005 || Kitt Peak || Spacewatch || — || align=right | 2.1 km || 
|-id=449 bgcolor=#d6d6d6
| 411449 ||  || — || November 28, 2010 || Mount Lemmon || Mount Lemmon Survey || — || align=right | 3.7 km || 
|-id=450 bgcolor=#E9E9E9
| 411450 ||  || — || December 27, 2006 || Catalina || CSS || — || align=right | 1.8 km || 
|-id=451 bgcolor=#E9E9E9
| 411451 ||  || — || October 23, 2006 || Mount Lemmon || Mount Lemmon Survey || — || align=right | 1.1 km || 
|-id=452 bgcolor=#E9E9E9
| 411452 ||  || — || September 26, 2005 || Catalina || CSS || — || align=right | 2.9 km || 
|-id=453 bgcolor=#E9E9E9
| 411453 ||  || — || October 29, 2010 || Kitt Peak || Spacewatch || — || align=right | 1.3 km || 
|-id=454 bgcolor=#d6d6d6
| 411454 ||  || — || November 30, 2010 || Mount Lemmon || Mount Lemmon Survey || EOS || align=right | 2.1 km || 
|-id=455 bgcolor=#E9E9E9
| 411455 ||  || — || May 4, 2009 || Kitt Peak || Spacewatch || EUN || align=right | 1.4 km || 
|-id=456 bgcolor=#E9E9E9
| 411456 ||  || — || June 17, 2010 || Mount Lemmon || Mount Lemmon Survey || — || align=right | 1.8 km || 
|-id=457 bgcolor=#E9E9E9
| 411457 ||  || — || November 17, 2006 || Kitt Peak || Spacewatch || — || align=right | 2.1 km || 
|-id=458 bgcolor=#E9E9E9
| 411458 ||  || — || November 20, 2006 || Kitt Peak || Spacewatch || — || align=right data-sort-value="0.87" | 870 m || 
|-id=459 bgcolor=#E9E9E9
| 411459 ||  || — || January 19, 2008 || Mount Lemmon || Mount Lemmon Survey || — || align=right | 2.8 km || 
|-id=460 bgcolor=#d6d6d6
| 411460 ||  || — || September 18, 2010 || Kitt Peak || Spacewatch || — || align=right | 4.0 km || 
|-id=461 bgcolor=#E9E9E9
| 411461 ||  || — || April 11, 2008 || Mount Lemmon || Mount Lemmon Survey || — || align=right | 1.5 km || 
|-id=462 bgcolor=#E9E9E9
| 411462 ||  || — || October 29, 2010 || Kitt Peak || Spacewatch || — || align=right | 3.0 km || 
|-id=463 bgcolor=#E9E9E9
| 411463 ||  || — || October 12, 2005 || Kitt Peak || Spacewatch || — || align=right | 2.0 km || 
|-id=464 bgcolor=#E9E9E9
| 411464 ||  || — || October 28, 2010 || Mount Lemmon || Mount Lemmon Survey || — || align=right data-sort-value="0.99" | 990 m || 
|-id=465 bgcolor=#E9E9E9
| 411465 ||  || — || November 18, 2006 || Kitt Peak || Spacewatch || (194) || align=right | 1.3 km || 
|-id=466 bgcolor=#E9E9E9
| 411466 ||  || — || December 15, 2001 || Socorro || LINEAR || — || align=right | 2.7 km || 
|-id=467 bgcolor=#E9E9E9
| 411467 ||  || — || December 24, 2006 || Kitt Peak || Spacewatch || — || align=right | 1.3 km || 
|-id=468 bgcolor=#E9E9E9
| 411468 ||  || — || December 16, 2006 || Kitt Peak || Spacewatch || — || align=right | 1.2 km || 
|-id=469 bgcolor=#E9E9E9
| 411469 ||  || — || July 10, 2005 || Kitt Peak || Spacewatch || — || align=right | 1.5 km || 
|-id=470 bgcolor=#E9E9E9
| 411470 ||  || — || December 10, 2006 || Kitt Peak || Spacewatch || — || align=right | 1.8 km || 
|-id=471 bgcolor=#E9E9E9
| 411471 ||  || — || October 6, 2005 || Mount Lemmon || Mount Lemmon Survey || — || align=right | 1.8 km || 
|-id=472 bgcolor=#d6d6d6
| 411472 ||  || — || February 27, 2006 || Catalina || CSS || — || align=right | 4.2 km || 
|-id=473 bgcolor=#d6d6d6
| 411473 ||  || — || October 26, 2009 || Mount Lemmon || Mount Lemmon Survey || — || align=right | 2.9 km || 
|-id=474 bgcolor=#d6d6d6
| 411474 ||  || — || September 17, 2009 || Mount Lemmon || Mount Lemmon Survey || VER || align=right | 3.1 km || 
|-id=475 bgcolor=#d6d6d6
| 411475 ||  || — || December 13, 1999 || Socorro || LINEAR || — || align=right | 3.2 km || 
|-id=476 bgcolor=#d6d6d6
| 411476 ||  || — || September 24, 2009 || Catalina || CSS || EOS || align=right | 2.5 km || 
|-id=477 bgcolor=#E9E9E9
| 411477 ||  || — || November 25, 2005 || Catalina || CSS || GEF || align=right | 1.3 km || 
|-id=478 bgcolor=#d6d6d6
| 411478 ||  || — || February 25, 2006 || Catalina || CSS || — || align=right | 5.2 km || 
|-id=479 bgcolor=#E9E9E9
| 411479 ||  || — || December 17, 2001 || Socorro || LINEAR || — || align=right | 2.2 km || 
|-id=480 bgcolor=#d6d6d6
| 411480 ||  || — || January 23, 2006 || Mount Lemmon || Mount Lemmon Survey || TEL || align=right | 1.1 km || 
|-id=481 bgcolor=#d6d6d6
| 411481 ||  || — || October 18, 1998 || Kitt Peak || Spacewatch || THM || align=right | 2.3 km || 
|-id=482 bgcolor=#d6d6d6
| 411482 ||  || — || December 30, 2005 || Kitt Peak || Spacewatch || — || align=right | 2.1 km || 
|-id=483 bgcolor=#E9E9E9
| 411483 ||  || — || November 5, 2010 || Mount Lemmon || Mount Lemmon Survey || — || align=right | 2.7 km || 
|-id=484 bgcolor=#d6d6d6
| 411484 ||  || — || October 21, 2009 || Mount Lemmon || Mount Lemmon Survey || — || align=right | 2.2 km || 
|-id=485 bgcolor=#d6d6d6
| 411485 ||  || — || October 22, 2009 || Mount Lemmon || Mount Lemmon Survey || — || align=right | 2.3 km || 
|-id=486 bgcolor=#d6d6d6
| 411486 ||  || — || March 25, 2007 || Mount Lemmon || Mount Lemmon Survey || — || align=right | 4.8 km || 
|-id=487 bgcolor=#d6d6d6
| 411487 ||  || — || April 25, 2007 || Kitt Peak || Spacewatch || EOS || align=right | 2.5 km || 
|-id=488 bgcolor=#d6d6d6
| 411488 ||  || — || November 10, 2009 || Kitt Peak || Spacewatch || — || align=right | 2.6 km || 
|-id=489 bgcolor=#d6d6d6
| 411489 ||  || — || December 6, 2010 || Mount Lemmon || Mount Lemmon Survey || EOS || align=right | 1.8 km || 
|-id=490 bgcolor=#d6d6d6
| 411490 ||  || — || December 7, 2010 || Mount Lemmon || Mount Lemmon Survey || — || align=right | 3.5 km || 
|-id=491 bgcolor=#E9E9E9
| 411491 ||  || — || November 21, 2005 || Kitt Peak || Spacewatch || — || align=right | 2.1 km || 
|-id=492 bgcolor=#E9E9E9
| 411492 ||  || — || January 12, 2011 || Mount Lemmon || Mount Lemmon Survey || — || align=right | 2.6 km || 
|-id=493 bgcolor=#d6d6d6
| 411493 ||  || — || August 7, 2008 || Kitt Peak || Spacewatch || — || align=right | 2.6 km || 
|-id=494 bgcolor=#E9E9E9
| 411494 ||  || — || December 6, 2010 || Mount Lemmon || Mount Lemmon Survey || — || align=right | 1.6 km || 
|-id=495 bgcolor=#d6d6d6
| 411495 ||  || — || December 9, 2010 || Mount Lemmon || Mount Lemmon Survey || — || align=right | 3.1 km || 
|-id=496 bgcolor=#d6d6d6
| 411496 ||  || — || September 18, 2003 || Kitt Peak || Spacewatch || — || align=right | 2.4 km || 
|-id=497 bgcolor=#d6d6d6
| 411497 ||  || — || January 13, 2011 || Mount Lemmon || Mount Lemmon Survey || EOS || align=right | 2.2 km || 
|-id=498 bgcolor=#E9E9E9
| 411498 ||  || — || December 10, 2010 || Mount Lemmon || Mount Lemmon Survey || — || align=right | 2.5 km || 
|-id=499 bgcolor=#E9E9E9
| 411499 ||  || — || January 17, 2007 || Catalina || CSS || — || align=right | 1.7 km || 
|-id=500 bgcolor=#E9E9E9
| 411500 ||  || — || November 24, 2006 || Mount Lemmon || Mount Lemmon Survey || — || align=right data-sort-value="0.80" | 800 m || 
|}

411501–411600 

|-bgcolor=#d6d6d6
| 411501 ||  || — || July 29, 2008 || Mount Lemmon || Mount Lemmon Survey || EOS || align=right | 2.6 km || 
|-id=502 bgcolor=#d6d6d6
| 411502 ||  || — || November 7, 2010 || Mount Lemmon || Mount Lemmon Survey || — || align=right | 2.8 km || 
|-id=503 bgcolor=#d6d6d6
| 411503 ||  || — || January 10, 2011 || Mount Lemmon || Mount Lemmon Survey || — || align=right | 3.3 km || 
|-id=504 bgcolor=#d6d6d6
| 411504 ||  || — || February 3, 2000 || Kitt Peak || Spacewatch || HYG || align=right | 2.5 km || 
|-id=505 bgcolor=#E9E9E9
| 411505 ||  || — || December 11, 2001 || Socorro || LINEAR || — || align=right | 1.2 km || 
|-id=506 bgcolor=#d6d6d6
| 411506 ||  || — || December 13, 1999 || Kitt Peak || Spacewatch || — || align=right | 2.5 km || 
|-id=507 bgcolor=#d6d6d6
| 411507 ||  || — || December 16, 2004 || Socorro || LINEAR || LIX || align=right | 3.9 km || 
|-id=508 bgcolor=#d6d6d6
| 411508 ||  || — || January 27, 2006 || Mount Lemmon || Mount Lemmon Survey || — || align=right | 2.2 km || 
|-id=509 bgcolor=#d6d6d6
| 411509 ||  || — || January 18, 2010 || WISE || WISE || — || align=right | 3.5 km || 
|-id=510 bgcolor=#d6d6d6
| 411510 ||  || — || October 15, 1993 || Kitt Peak || Spacewatch || — || align=right | 2.5 km || 
|-id=511 bgcolor=#d6d6d6
| 411511 ||  || — || November 9, 2009 || Catalina || CSS || — || align=right | 2.7 km || 
|-id=512 bgcolor=#d6d6d6
| 411512 ||  || — || January 14, 2011 || Kitt Peak || Spacewatch || — || align=right | 3.8 km || 
|-id=513 bgcolor=#d6d6d6
| 411513 ||  || — || January 16, 2000 || Kitt Peak || Spacewatch || — || align=right | 2.0 km || 
|-id=514 bgcolor=#d6d6d6
| 411514 ||  || — || July 30, 2008 || Mount Lemmon || Mount Lemmon Survey || VER || align=right | 2.7 km || 
|-id=515 bgcolor=#d6d6d6
| 411515 ||  || — || January 28, 2011 || Mount Lemmon || Mount Lemmon Survey || VER || align=right | 2.7 km || 
|-id=516 bgcolor=#d6d6d6
| 411516 ||  || — || September 4, 2008 || Kitt Peak || Spacewatch || — || align=right | 3.6 km || 
|-id=517 bgcolor=#d6d6d6
| 411517 ||  || — || November 23, 2009 || Mount Lemmon || Mount Lemmon Survey || — || align=right | 2.7 km || 
|-id=518 bgcolor=#E9E9E9
| 411518 ||  || — || March 5, 1997 || Kitt Peak || Spacewatch || — || align=right | 2.2 km || 
|-id=519 bgcolor=#d6d6d6
| 411519 ||  || — || February 24, 2006 || Kitt Peak || Spacewatch || — || align=right | 1.8 km || 
|-id=520 bgcolor=#d6d6d6
| 411520 ||  || — || December 15, 2004 || Kitt Peak || Spacewatch || HYG || align=right | 3.3 km || 
|-id=521 bgcolor=#d6d6d6
| 411521 ||  || — || January 14, 2011 || Kitt Peak || Spacewatch || — || align=right | 2.4 km || 
|-id=522 bgcolor=#d6d6d6
| 411522 ||  || — || December 5, 2010 || Mount Lemmon || Mount Lemmon Survey || — || align=right | 3.1 km || 
|-id=523 bgcolor=#d6d6d6
| 411523 ||  || — || October 4, 2003 || Kitt Peak || Spacewatch || — || align=right | 3.4 km || 
|-id=524 bgcolor=#d6d6d6
| 411524 ||  || — || January 26, 2006 || Kitt Peak || Spacewatch || — || align=right | 3.1 km || 
|-id=525 bgcolor=#d6d6d6
| 411525 ||  || — || December 17, 1999 || Kitt Peak || Spacewatch || — || align=right | 3.1 km || 
|-id=526 bgcolor=#d6d6d6
| 411526 ||  || — || March 25, 2006 || Mount Lemmon || Mount Lemmon Survey || — || align=right | 3.5 km || 
|-id=527 bgcolor=#E9E9E9
| 411527 ||  || — || November 25, 2005 || Catalina || CSS || — || align=right | 2.4 km || 
|-id=528 bgcolor=#d6d6d6
| 411528 ||  || — || April 24, 2007 || Mount Lemmon || Mount Lemmon Survey || — || align=right | 2.7 km || 
|-id=529 bgcolor=#d6d6d6
| 411529 ||  || — || December 11, 2004 || Kitt Peak || Spacewatch || — || align=right | 3.1 km || 
|-id=530 bgcolor=#d6d6d6
| 411530 ||  || — || September 3, 2008 || Kitt Peak || Spacewatch || — || align=right | 3.7 km || 
|-id=531 bgcolor=#d6d6d6
| 411531 ||  || — || October 2, 2009 || Mount Lemmon || Mount Lemmon Survey || NAE || align=right | 2.9 km || 
|-id=532 bgcolor=#d6d6d6
| 411532 ||  || — || January 25, 2010 || WISE || WISE || VER || align=right | 2.9 km || 
|-id=533 bgcolor=#d6d6d6
| 411533 ||  || — || January 8, 2011 || Mount Lemmon || Mount Lemmon Survey || — || align=right | 2.9 km || 
|-id=534 bgcolor=#d6d6d6
| 411534 ||  || — || November 16, 2009 || Kitt Peak || Spacewatch || 7:4 || align=right | 2.6 km || 
|-id=535 bgcolor=#d6d6d6
| 411535 ||  || — || October 2, 2009 || Mount Lemmon || Mount Lemmon Survey || EOS || align=right | 1.8 km || 
|-id=536 bgcolor=#d6d6d6
| 411536 ||  || — || January 27, 2000 || Kitt Peak || Spacewatch ||  || align=right | 2.7 km || 
|-id=537 bgcolor=#d6d6d6
| 411537 ||  || — || December 5, 2010 || Mount Lemmon || Mount Lemmon Survey || — || align=right | 4.3 km || 
|-id=538 bgcolor=#E9E9E9
| 411538 ||  || — || October 26, 2005 || Kitt Peak || Spacewatch || AEO || align=right | 1.1 km || 
|-id=539 bgcolor=#E9E9E9
| 411539 ||  || — || November 1, 2010 || Mount Lemmon || Mount Lemmon Survey || GEF || align=right | 1.5 km || 
|-id=540 bgcolor=#d6d6d6
| 411540 ||  || — || January 27, 2010 || WISE || WISE || — || align=right | 3.7 km || 
|-id=541 bgcolor=#d6d6d6
| 411541 ||  || — || September 2, 2008 || Kitt Peak || Spacewatch || — || align=right | 2.8 km || 
|-id=542 bgcolor=#d6d6d6
| 411542 ||  || — || January 8, 2011 || Mount Lemmon || Mount Lemmon Survey || — || align=right | 2.4 km || 
|-id=543 bgcolor=#d6d6d6
| 411543 ||  || — || December 8, 2010 || Mount Lemmon || Mount Lemmon Survey || — || align=right | 2.7 km || 
|-id=544 bgcolor=#d6d6d6
| 411544 ||  || — || March 30, 2000 || Kitt Peak || Spacewatch || — || align=right | 2.8 km || 
|-id=545 bgcolor=#d6d6d6
| 411545 ||  || — || January 8, 2006 || Mount Lemmon || Mount Lemmon Survey || — || align=right | 2.5 km || 
|-id=546 bgcolor=#d6d6d6
| 411546 ||  || — || November 11, 2009 || Kitt Peak || Spacewatch || — || align=right | 3.3 km || 
|-id=547 bgcolor=#d6d6d6
| 411547 ||  || — || January 13, 1999 || Kitt Peak || Spacewatch || — || align=right | 4.8 km || 
|-id=548 bgcolor=#d6d6d6
| 411548 ||  || — || January 14, 2011 || Kitt Peak || Spacewatch || — || align=right | 3.1 km || 
|-id=549 bgcolor=#d6d6d6
| 411549 ||  || — || February 2, 2006 || Kitt Peak || Spacewatch || — || align=right | 3.0 km || 
|-id=550 bgcolor=#E9E9E9
| 411550 ||  || — || December 8, 2005 || Kitt Peak || Spacewatch || — || align=right | 2.7 km || 
|-id=551 bgcolor=#E9E9E9
| 411551 ||  || — || September 10, 2004 || Kitt Peak || Spacewatch || — || align=right | 2.4 km || 
|-id=552 bgcolor=#E9E9E9
| 411552 ||  || — || September 25, 2000 || Anderson Mesa || LONEOS ||  || align=right | 3.2 km || 
|-id=553 bgcolor=#E9E9E9
| 411553 ||  || — || March 14, 2007 || Catalina || CSS || — || align=right | 1.5 km || 
|-id=554 bgcolor=#d6d6d6
| 411554 ||  || — || February 1, 2000 || Kitt Peak || Spacewatch || THM || align=right | 2.3 km || 
|-id=555 bgcolor=#d6d6d6
| 411555 ||  || — || February 2, 2006 || Kitt Peak || Spacewatch || — || align=right | 2.9 km || 
|-id=556 bgcolor=#d6d6d6
| 411556 ||  || — || April 2, 2006 || Kitt Peak || Spacewatch || THM || align=right | 2.1 km || 
|-id=557 bgcolor=#d6d6d6
| 411557 ||  || — || December 1, 2010 || Catalina || CSS || — || align=right | 4.2 km || 
|-id=558 bgcolor=#d6d6d6
| 411558 ||  || — || January 8, 2006 || Mount Lemmon || Mount Lemmon Survey || — || align=right | 3.0 km || 
|-id=559 bgcolor=#d6d6d6
| 411559 ||  || — || September 20, 2003 || Kitt Peak || Spacewatch || — || align=right | 4.0 km || 
|-id=560 bgcolor=#d6d6d6
| 411560 ||  || — || October 1, 2009 || Mount Lemmon || Mount Lemmon Survey || LIX || align=right | 3.7 km || 
|-id=561 bgcolor=#d6d6d6
| 411561 ||  || — || May 21, 2006 || Kitt Peak || Spacewatch || — || align=right | 3.2 km || 
|-id=562 bgcolor=#E9E9E9
| 411562 ||  || — || September 26, 1995 || Kitt Peak || Spacewatch || GEF || align=right | 1.0 km || 
|-id=563 bgcolor=#d6d6d6
| 411563 ||  || — || December 12, 2004 || Kitt Peak || Spacewatch || — || align=right | 3.1 km || 
|-id=564 bgcolor=#d6d6d6
| 411564 ||  || — || October 24, 2009 || Kitt Peak || Spacewatch || HYG || align=right | 2.6 km || 
|-id=565 bgcolor=#d6d6d6
| 411565 ||  || — || January 18, 2005 || Kitt Peak || Spacewatch || — || align=right | 2.6 km || 
|-id=566 bgcolor=#d6d6d6
| 411566 ||  || — || December 20, 2004 || Mount Lemmon || Mount Lemmon Survey || — || align=right | 4.0 km || 
|-id=567 bgcolor=#d6d6d6
| 411567 ||  || — || September 6, 2008 || Mount Lemmon || Mount Lemmon Survey || — || align=right | 2.9 km || 
|-id=568 bgcolor=#d6d6d6
| 411568 ||  || — || April 2, 2006 || Anderson Mesa || LONEOS || — || align=right | 3.9 km || 
|-id=569 bgcolor=#d6d6d6
| 411569 ||  || — || March 14, 2000 || Kitt Peak || Spacewatch || LIX || align=right | 3.1 km || 
|-id=570 bgcolor=#d6d6d6
| 411570 ||  || — || October 21, 2003 || Kitt Peak || Spacewatch || — || align=right | 2.5 km || 
|-id=571 bgcolor=#d6d6d6
| 411571 ||  || — || February 9, 2005 || Mount Lemmon || Mount Lemmon Survey || — || align=right | 4.8 km || 
|-id=572 bgcolor=#E9E9E9
| 411572 ||  || — || November 1, 2000 || Socorro || LINEAR || — || align=right | 2.9 km || 
|-id=573 bgcolor=#d6d6d6
| 411573 ||  || — || April 3, 2000 || Kitt Peak || Spacewatch || — || align=right | 3.3 km || 
|-id=574 bgcolor=#d6d6d6
| 411574 ||  || — || September 27, 2003 || Kitt Peak || Spacewatch || TIR || align=right | 3.4 km || 
|-id=575 bgcolor=#d6d6d6
| 411575 ||  || — || January 28, 2011 || Mount Lemmon || Mount Lemmon Survey || — || align=right | 3.1 km || 
|-id=576 bgcolor=#d6d6d6
| 411576 ||  || — || October 15, 2009 || Catalina || CSS || — || align=right | 2.6 km || 
|-id=577 bgcolor=#d6d6d6
| 411577 ||  || — || April 24, 2006 || Anderson Mesa || LONEOS || — || align=right | 3.1 km || 
|-id=578 bgcolor=#d6d6d6
| 411578 ||  || — || November 19, 2009 || Mount Lemmon || Mount Lemmon Survey || — || align=right | 2.4 km || 
|-id=579 bgcolor=#d6d6d6
| 411579 ||  || — || September 21, 2003 || Kitt Peak || Spacewatch || — || align=right | 3.9 km || 
|-id=580 bgcolor=#d6d6d6
| 411580 ||  || — || February 25, 2006 || Mount Lemmon || Mount Lemmon Survey || EMA || align=right | 3.2 km || 
|-id=581 bgcolor=#d6d6d6
| 411581 ||  || — || December 12, 2004 || Kitt Peak || Spacewatch || — || align=right | 3.3 km || 
|-id=582 bgcolor=#d6d6d6
| 411582 ||  || — || October 12, 2009 || Mount Lemmon || Mount Lemmon Survey || — || align=right | 3.0 km || 
|-id=583 bgcolor=#d6d6d6
| 411583 ||  || — || March 3, 2005 || Kitt Peak || Spacewatch || — || align=right | 2.6 km || 
|-id=584 bgcolor=#d6d6d6
| 411584 ||  || — || October 24, 2003 || Socorro || LINEAR || — || align=right | 4.6 km || 
|-id=585 bgcolor=#d6d6d6
| 411585 ||  || — || November 15, 2003 || Kitt Peak || Spacewatch || — || align=right | 3.9 km || 
|-id=586 bgcolor=#d6d6d6
| 411586 ||  || — || January 8, 2010 || Kitt Peak || Spacewatch || 7:4 || align=right | 3.6 km || 
|-id=587 bgcolor=#d6d6d6
| 411587 ||  || — || November 26, 2003 || Kitt Peak || Spacewatch || — || align=right | 3.1 km || 
|-id=588 bgcolor=#d6d6d6
| 411588 ||  || — || September 30, 2009 || Mount Lemmon || Mount Lemmon Survey || LIX || align=right | 3.8 km || 
|-id=589 bgcolor=#d6d6d6
| 411589 ||  || — || November 23, 2009 || Catalina || CSS || — || align=right | 3.2 km || 
|-id=590 bgcolor=#E9E9E9
| 411590 ||  || — || November 21, 2005 || Kitt Peak || Spacewatch || — || align=right | 2.5 km || 
|-id=591 bgcolor=#d6d6d6
| 411591 ||  || — || January 15, 2005 || Socorro || LINEAR || LIX || align=right | 3.8 km || 
|-id=592 bgcolor=#d6d6d6
| 411592 ||  || — || February 11, 2010 || WISE || WISE || (895) || align=right | 5.4 km || 
|-id=593 bgcolor=#d6d6d6
| 411593 ||  || — || October 2, 2008 || Catalina || CSS || — || align=right | 4.0 km || 
|-id=594 bgcolor=#d6d6d6
| 411594 ||  || — || March 9, 2005 || Mount Lemmon || Mount Lemmon Survey || EOS || align=right | 2.6 km || 
|-id=595 bgcolor=#d6d6d6
| 411595 ||  || — || September 27, 1998 || Kitt Peak || Spacewatch || — || align=right | 2.9 km || 
|-id=596 bgcolor=#d6d6d6
| 411596 ||  || — || December 21, 2004 || Catalina || CSS || — || align=right | 3.2 km || 
|-id=597 bgcolor=#d6d6d6
| 411597 ||  || — || March 2, 2010 || WISE || WISE || — || align=right | 3.6 km || 
|-id=598 bgcolor=#d6d6d6
| 411598 ||  || — || September 27, 2003 || Kitt Peak || Spacewatch || — || align=right | 2.5 km || 
|-id=599 bgcolor=#d6d6d6
| 411599 ||  || — || January 31, 2010 || WISE || WISE || EUP || align=right | 4.5 km || 
|-id=600 bgcolor=#d6d6d6
| 411600 ||  || — || December 14, 2004 || Kitt Peak || Spacewatch || — || align=right | 2.2 km || 
|}

411601–411700 

|-bgcolor=#fefefe
| 411601 ||  || — || November 23, 2006 || Kitt Peak || Spacewatch || — || align=right data-sort-value="0.73" | 730 m || 
|-id=602 bgcolor=#d6d6d6
| 411602 ||  || — || October 6, 2008 || Mount Lemmon || Mount Lemmon Survey || — || align=right | 3.5 km || 
|-id=603 bgcolor=#d6d6d6
| 411603 ||  || — || October 20, 2003 || Kitt Peak || Spacewatch || — || align=right | 3.5 km || 
|-id=604 bgcolor=#d6d6d6
| 411604 ||  || — || September 23, 2008 || Mount Lemmon || Mount Lemmon Survey || — || align=right | 3.1 km || 
|-id=605 bgcolor=#d6d6d6
| 411605 ||  || — || September 24, 2008 || Kitt Peak || Spacewatch || — || align=right | 3.5 km || 
|-id=606 bgcolor=#d6d6d6
| 411606 ||  || — || February 28, 2010 || WISE || WISE || — || align=right | 4.0 km || 
|-id=607 bgcolor=#d6d6d6
| 411607 ||  || — || April 29, 2006 || Kitt Peak || Spacewatch || — || align=right | 2.6 km || 
|-id=608 bgcolor=#d6d6d6
| 411608 ||  || — || April 8, 2011 || Kitt Peak || Spacewatch || — || align=right | 3.6 km || 
|-id=609 bgcolor=#fefefe
| 411609 ||  || — || November 4, 2007 || Mount Lemmon || Mount Lemmon Survey || H || align=right data-sort-value="0.71" | 710 m || 
|-id=610 bgcolor=#E9E9E9
| 411610 ||  || — || October 22, 2003 || Kitt Peak || Spacewatch || — || align=right | 2.1 km || 
|-id=611 bgcolor=#FFC2E0
| 411611 ||  || — || August 22, 2011 || La Sagra || OAM Obs. || AMO || align=right data-sort-value="0.36" | 360 m || 
|-id=612 bgcolor=#fefefe
| 411612 ||  || — || May 15, 2010 || WISE || WISE || — || align=right | 3.1 km || 
|-id=613 bgcolor=#fefefe
| 411613 ||  || — || September 21, 2011 || Kitt Peak || Spacewatch || — || align=right data-sort-value="0.95" | 950 m || 
|-id=614 bgcolor=#fefefe
| 411614 ||  || — || November 21, 2008 || Mount Lemmon || Mount Lemmon Survey || — || align=right data-sort-value="0.58" | 580 m || 
|-id=615 bgcolor=#fefefe
| 411615 ||  || — || September 18, 1995 || Kitt Peak || Spacewatch || — || align=right data-sort-value="0.46" | 460 m || 
|-id=616 bgcolor=#fefefe
| 411616 ||  || — || September 21, 2011 || Kitt Peak || Spacewatch || — || align=right data-sort-value="0.79" | 790 m || 
|-id=617 bgcolor=#fefefe
| 411617 ||  || — || October 29, 2005 || Kitt Peak || Spacewatch || — || align=right data-sort-value="0.44" | 440 m || 
|-id=618 bgcolor=#fefefe
| 411618 ||  || — || September 22, 2011 || Kitt Peak || Spacewatch || — || align=right data-sort-value="0.75" | 750 m || 
|-id=619 bgcolor=#fefefe
| 411619 ||  || — || December 22, 2008 || Kitt Peak || Spacewatch || critical || align=right data-sort-value="0.39" | 390 m || 
|-id=620 bgcolor=#fefefe
| 411620 ||  || — || March 16, 2010 || Catalina || CSS || — || align=right | 1.0 km || 
|-id=621 bgcolor=#fefefe
| 411621 ||  || — || October 18, 2011 || Mount Lemmon || Mount Lemmon Survey || — || align=right data-sort-value="0.62" | 620 m || 
|-id=622 bgcolor=#fefefe
| 411622 ||  || — || February 2, 2009 || Kitt Peak || Spacewatch || — || align=right data-sort-value="0.62" | 620 m || 
|-id=623 bgcolor=#fefefe
| 411623 ||  || — || December 5, 2005 || Kitt Peak || Spacewatch || — || align=right data-sort-value="0.58" | 580 m || 
|-id=624 bgcolor=#fefefe
| 411624 ||  || — || February 2, 2006 || Mount Lemmon || Mount Lemmon Survey || — || align=right data-sort-value="0.83" | 830 m || 
|-id=625 bgcolor=#fefefe
| 411625 ||  || — || November 17, 2001 || Socorro || LINEAR || — || align=right data-sort-value="0.60" | 600 m || 
|-id=626 bgcolor=#fefefe
| 411626 ||  || — || October 18, 2011 || Mount Lemmon || Mount Lemmon Survey || — || align=right data-sort-value="0.58" | 580 m || 
|-id=627 bgcolor=#fefefe
| 411627 ||  || — || October 19, 2011 || Kitt Peak || Spacewatch || — || align=right data-sort-value="0.66" | 660 m || 
|-id=628 bgcolor=#fefefe
| 411628 ||  || — || October 21, 2011 || Mount Lemmon || Mount Lemmon Survey || — || align=right | 1.0 km || 
|-id=629 bgcolor=#fefefe
| 411629 ||  || — || May 4, 2010 || Catalina || CSS || — || align=right data-sort-value="0.91" | 910 m || 
|-id=630 bgcolor=#fefefe
| 411630 ||  || — || December 30, 2008 || Mount Lemmon || Mount Lemmon Survey || — || align=right data-sort-value="0.76" | 760 m || 
|-id=631 bgcolor=#fefefe
| 411631 ||  || — || December 31, 2008 || Kitt Peak || Spacewatch || — || align=right data-sort-value="0.68" | 680 m || 
|-id=632 bgcolor=#fefefe
| 411632 ||  || — || December 30, 2008 || Mount Lemmon || Mount Lemmon Survey || — || align=right data-sort-value="0.68" | 680 m || 
|-id=633 bgcolor=#fefefe
| 411633 ||  || — || November 24, 2008 || Mount Lemmon || Mount Lemmon Survey || — || align=right data-sort-value="0.98" | 980 m || 
|-id=634 bgcolor=#fefefe
| 411634 ||  || — || December 14, 2004 || Kitt Peak || Spacewatch || V || align=right data-sort-value="0.68" | 680 m || 
|-id=635 bgcolor=#fefefe
| 411635 ||  || — || March 13, 2010 || Kitt Peak || Spacewatch || — || align=right data-sort-value="0.59" | 590 m || 
|-id=636 bgcolor=#fefefe
| 411636 ||  || — || October 26, 2011 || Kitt Peak || Spacewatch || — || align=right data-sort-value="0.60" | 600 m || 
|-id=637 bgcolor=#fefefe
| 411637 ||  || — || September 23, 2011 || Kitt Peak || Spacewatch || — || align=right data-sort-value="0.69" | 690 m || 
|-id=638 bgcolor=#fefefe
| 411638 ||  || — || January 26, 2006 || Kitt Peak || Spacewatch || — || align=right data-sort-value="0.68" | 680 m || 
|-id=639 bgcolor=#fefefe
| 411639 ||  || — || October 16, 2007 || Mount Lemmon || Mount Lemmon Survey || V || align=right data-sort-value="0.55" | 550 m || 
|-id=640 bgcolor=#fefefe
| 411640 ||  || — || September 21, 2011 || Kitt Peak || Spacewatch || — || align=right data-sort-value="0.58" | 580 m || 
|-id=641 bgcolor=#fefefe
| 411641 ||  || — || October 19, 2011 || Kitt Peak || Spacewatch || — || align=right data-sort-value="0.65" | 650 m || 
|-id=642 bgcolor=#fefefe
| 411642 ||  || — || December 30, 2008 || Kitt Peak || Spacewatch || — || align=right data-sort-value="0.58" | 580 m || 
|-id=643 bgcolor=#fefefe
| 411643 ||  || — || December 30, 2008 || Mount Lemmon || Mount Lemmon Survey || — || align=right data-sort-value="0.83" | 830 m || 
|-id=644 bgcolor=#fefefe
| 411644 ||  || — || January 7, 2006 || Kitt Peak || Spacewatch || — || align=right data-sort-value="0.62" | 620 m || 
|-id=645 bgcolor=#E9E9E9
| 411645 ||  || — || March 31, 2010 || WISE || WISE || ADE || align=right | 3.5 km || 
|-id=646 bgcolor=#fefefe
| 411646 ||  || — || October 31, 2011 || XuYi || PMO NEO || — || align=right data-sort-value="0.97" | 970 m || 
|-id=647 bgcolor=#fefefe
| 411647 ||  || — || September 29, 2011 || Kitt Peak || Spacewatch || — || align=right data-sort-value="0.65" | 650 m || 
|-id=648 bgcolor=#fefefe
| 411648 ||  || — || January 17, 2009 || Catalina || CSS || — || align=right data-sort-value="0.71" | 710 m || 
|-id=649 bgcolor=#fefefe
| 411649 ||  || — || September 20, 2011 || Mount Lemmon || Mount Lemmon Survey || — || align=right data-sort-value="0.75" | 750 m || 
|-id=650 bgcolor=#fefefe
| 411650 ||  || — || December 22, 2008 || Catalina || CSS || — || align=right data-sort-value="0.98" | 980 m || 
|-id=651 bgcolor=#fefefe
| 411651 ||  || — || February 27, 2006 || Kitt Peak || Spacewatch || — || align=right data-sort-value="0.87" | 870 m || 
|-id=652 bgcolor=#fefefe
| 411652 ||  || — || December 31, 2008 || Kitt Peak || Spacewatch || — || align=right data-sort-value="0.67" | 670 m || 
|-id=653 bgcolor=#fefefe
| 411653 ||  || — || December 10, 2004 || Kitt Peak || Spacewatch || NYS || align=right data-sort-value="0.64" | 640 m || 
|-id=654 bgcolor=#fefefe
| 411654 ||  || — || May 12, 2010 || Kitt Peak || Spacewatch || — || align=right data-sort-value="0.80" | 800 m || 
|-id=655 bgcolor=#FFC2E0
| 411655 ||  || — || August 1, 1995 || Kitt Peak || Spacewatch || AMO || align=right data-sort-value="0.69" | 690 m || 
|-id=656 bgcolor=#fefefe
| 411656 ||  || — || December 22, 2008 || Mount Lemmon || Mount Lemmon Survey || — || align=right data-sort-value="0.59" | 590 m || 
|-id=657 bgcolor=#d6d6d6
| 411657 ||  || — || May 4, 2009 || Mount Lemmon || Mount Lemmon Survey || ARM || align=right | 4.1 km || 
|-id=658 bgcolor=#fefefe
| 411658 ||  || — || November 17, 2011 || Kitt Peak || Spacewatch || — || align=right data-sort-value="0.88" | 880 m || 
|-id=659 bgcolor=#fefefe
| 411659 ||  || — || November 17, 2011 || Kitt Peak || Spacewatch || — || align=right data-sort-value="0.78" | 780 m || 
|-id=660 bgcolor=#fefefe
| 411660 ||  || — || October 11, 2007 || Kitt Peak || Spacewatch || — || align=right data-sort-value="0.86" | 860 m || 
|-id=661 bgcolor=#fefefe
| 411661 ||  || — || October 14, 2007 || Mount Lemmon || Mount Lemmon Survey || — || align=right data-sort-value="0.79" | 790 m || 
|-id=662 bgcolor=#fefefe
| 411662 ||  || — || March 9, 2005 || Kitt Peak || Spacewatch || — || align=right data-sort-value="0.71" | 710 m || 
|-id=663 bgcolor=#fefefe
| 411663 ||  || — || September 22, 2001 || Kitt Peak || Spacewatch || — || align=right data-sort-value="0.55" | 550 m || 
|-id=664 bgcolor=#fefefe
| 411664 ||  || — || November 30, 2008 || Mount Lemmon || Mount Lemmon Survey || — || align=right data-sort-value="0.78" | 780 m || 
|-id=665 bgcolor=#fefefe
| 411665 ||  || — || January 30, 2009 || Mount Lemmon || Mount Lemmon Survey || — || align=right data-sort-value="0.76" | 760 m || 
|-id=666 bgcolor=#fefefe
| 411666 ||  || — || September 17, 2004 || Anderson Mesa || LONEOS || — || align=right data-sort-value="0.87" | 870 m || 
|-id=667 bgcolor=#fefefe
| 411667 ||  || — || September 24, 2000 || Anderson Mesa || LONEOS || — || align=right data-sort-value="0.96" | 960 m || 
|-id=668 bgcolor=#fefefe
| 411668 ||  || — || November 20, 2004 || Kitt Peak || Spacewatch || — || align=right data-sort-value="0.71" | 710 m || 
|-id=669 bgcolor=#fefefe
| 411669 ||  || — || October 30, 2011 || Mount Lemmon || Mount Lemmon Survey || — || align=right data-sort-value="0.81" | 810 m || 
|-id=670 bgcolor=#fefefe
| 411670 ||  || — || January 22, 2006 || Mount Lemmon || Mount Lemmon Survey || — || align=right data-sort-value="0.53" | 530 m || 
|-id=671 bgcolor=#fefefe
| 411671 ||  || — || November 24, 2008 || Mount Lemmon || Mount Lemmon Survey || — || align=right data-sort-value="0.65" | 650 m || 
|-id=672 bgcolor=#fefefe
| 411672 ||  || — || August 10, 2004 || Socorro || LINEAR || — || align=right data-sort-value="0.64" | 640 m || 
|-id=673 bgcolor=#fefefe
| 411673 ||  || — || December 22, 2008 || Kitt Peak || Spacewatch || — || align=right data-sort-value="0.51" | 510 m || 
|-id=674 bgcolor=#fefefe
| 411674 ||  || — || October 28, 2011 || Mount Lemmon || Mount Lemmon Survey || — || align=right data-sort-value="0.72" | 720 m || 
|-id=675 bgcolor=#fefefe
| 411675 ||  || — || October 15, 1995 || Kitt Peak || Spacewatch || — || align=right data-sort-value="0.64" | 640 m || 
|-id=676 bgcolor=#fefefe
| 411676 ||  || — || January 18, 2009 || Catalina || CSS || — || align=right data-sort-value="0.75" | 750 m || 
|-id=677 bgcolor=#fefefe
| 411677 ||  || — || March 2, 2009 || Mount Lemmon || Mount Lemmon Survey || — || align=right data-sort-value="0.80" | 800 m || 
|-id=678 bgcolor=#E9E9E9
| 411678 ||  || — || December 5, 2007 || Kitt Peak || Spacewatch || — || align=right | 1.1 km || 
|-id=679 bgcolor=#fefefe
| 411679 ||  || — || October 19, 2007 || Mount Lemmon || Mount Lemmon Survey || — || align=right data-sort-value="0.75" | 750 m || 
|-id=680 bgcolor=#fefefe
| 411680 ||  || — || February 20, 2009 || Mount Lemmon || Mount Lemmon Survey || — || align=right | 1.0 km || 
|-id=681 bgcolor=#fefefe
| 411681 ||  || — || January 29, 2009 || Mount Lemmon || Mount Lemmon Survey || — || align=right data-sort-value="0.85" | 850 m || 
|-id=682 bgcolor=#fefefe
| 411682 ||  || — || September 9, 2007 || Kitt Peak || Spacewatch || — || align=right data-sort-value="0.83" | 830 m || 
|-id=683 bgcolor=#fefefe
| 411683 ||  || — || February 1, 2005 || Kitt Peak || Spacewatch || NYS || align=right data-sort-value="0.61" | 610 m || 
|-id=684 bgcolor=#fefefe
| 411684 ||  || — || December 18, 2004 || Mount Lemmon || Mount Lemmon Survey || — || align=right | 1.0 km || 
|-id=685 bgcolor=#fefefe
| 411685 ||  || — || December 24, 2011 || Catalina || CSS || — || align=right | 2.8 km || 
|-id=686 bgcolor=#fefefe
| 411686 ||  || — || April 4, 2005 || Catalina || CSS || — || align=right data-sort-value="0.98" | 980 m || 
|-id=687 bgcolor=#fefefe
| 411687 ||  || — || December 25, 2011 || Kitt Peak || Spacewatch || — || align=right data-sort-value="0.81" | 810 m || 
|-id=688 bgcolor=#fefefe
| 411688 ||  || — || February 4, 2005 || Mount Lemmon || Mount Lemmon Survey || — || align=right data-sort-value="0.72" | 720 m || 
|-id=689 bgcolor=#fefefe
| 411689 ||  || — || February 2, 2009 || Kitt Peak || Spacewatch || — || align=right data-sort-value="0.77" | 770 m || 
|-id=690 bgcolor=#E9E9E9
| 411690 ||  || — || December 26, 2011 || Kitt Peak || Spacewatch || — || align=right | 3.3 km || 
|-id=691 bgcolor=#fefefe
| 411691 ||  || — || December 26, 2011 || Kitt Peak || Spacewatch || — || align=right | 1.1 km || 
|-id=692 bgcolor=#E9E9E9
| 411692 ||  || — || January 18, 2008 || Mount Lemmon || Mount Lemmon Survey || — || align=right data-sort-value="0.94" | 940 m || 
|-id=693 bgcolor=#fefefe
| 411693 ||  || — || April 30, 2006 || Kitt Peak || Spacewatch || — || align=right data-sort-value="0.65" | 650 m || 
|-id=694 bgcolor=#fefefe
| 411694 ||  || — || May 6, 2006 || Mount Lemmon || Mount Lemmon Survey || V || align=right data-sort-value="0.73" | 730 m || 
|-id=695 bgcolor=#fefefe
| 411695 ||  || — || January 19, 2005 || Kitt Peak || Spacewatch || — || align=right data-sort-value="0.87" | 870 m || 
|-id=696 bgcolor=#fefefe
| 411696 ||  || — || March 11, 2005 || Mount Lemmon || Mount Lemmon Survey || NYS || align=right data-sort-value="0.72" | 720 m || 
|-id=697 bgcolor=#E9E9E9
| 411697 ||  || — || January 19, 2008 || Mount Lemmon || Mount Lemmon Survey || — || align=right | 1.3 km || 
|-id=698 bgcolor=#fefefe
| 411698 ||  || — || November 19, 2003 || Kitt Peak || Spacewatch || MAS || align=right data-sort-value="0.73" | 730 m || 
|-id=699 bgcolor=#fefefe
| 411699 ||  || — || January 3, 2001 || Kitt Peak || Spacewatch || — || align=right data-sort-value="0.79" | 790 m || 
|-id=700 bgcolor=#E9E9E9
| 411700 ||  || — || March 12, 2008 || Mount Lemmon || Mount Lemmon Survey || — || align=right | 3.1 km || 
|}

411701–411800 

|-bgcolor=#fefefe
| 411701 ||  || — || November 19, 2007 || Kitt Peak || Spacewatch || CLA || align=right | 1.4 km || 
|-id=702 bgcolor=#E9E9E9
| 411702 ||  || — || September 17, 2006 || Kitt Peak || Spacewatch || — || align=right data-sort-value="0.96" | 960 m || 
|-id=703 bgcolor=#E9E9E9
| 411703 ||  || — || October 21, 2006 || Kitt Peak || Spacewatch || — || align=right | 1.3 km || 
|-id=704 bgcolor=#fefefe
| 411704 ||  || — || April 18, 2009 || Kitt Peak || Spacewatch || — || align=right data-sort-value="0.96" | 960 m || 
|-id=705 bgcolor=#E9E9E9
| 411705 ||  || — || April 16, 2004 || Siding Spring || SSS || — || align=right | 1.6 km || 
|-id=706 bgcolor=#fefefe
| 411706 ||  || — || March 1, 2005 || Catalina || CSS || — || align=right | 1.1 km || 
|-id=707 bgcolor=#E9E9E9
| 411707 ||  || — || May 2, 2008 || Siding Spring || SSS || — || align=right | 2.2 km || 
|-id=708 bgcolor=#fefefe
| 411708 ||  || — || December 16, 2007 || Kitt Peak || Spacewatch || — || align=right data-sort-value="0.88" | 880 m || 
|-id=709 bgcolor=#fefefe
| 411709 ||  || — || October 30, 1999 || Kitt Peak || Spacewatch || — || align=right data-sort-value="0.87" | 870 m || 
|-id=710 bgcolor=#fefefe
| 411710 ||  || — || October 10, 2007 || Mount Lemmon || Mount Lemmon Survey || — || align=right data-sort-value="0.57" | 570 m || 
|-id=711 bgcolor=#fefefe
| 411711 ||  || — || January 1, 2008 || Mount Lemmon || Mount Lemmon Survey || — || align=right | 1.4 km || 
|-id=712 bgcolor=#fefefe
| 411712 ||  || — || November 14, 2007 || Kitt Peak || Spacewatch || MAS || align=right data-sort-value="0.68" | 680 m || 
|-id=713 bgcolor=#E9E9E9
| 411713 ||  || — || November 18, 2006 || Mount Lemmon || Mount Lemmon Survey || — || align=right | 2.2 km || 
|-id=714 bgcolor=#fefefe
| 411714 ||  || — || October 18, 2007 || Kitt Peak || Spacewatch || MAS || align=right data-sort-value="0.64" | 640 m || 
|-id=715 bgcolor=#fefefe
| 411715 ||  || — || November 6, 2007 || Mount Lemmon || Mount Lemmon Survey || — || align=right data-sort-value="0.96" | 960 m || 
|-id=716 bgcolor=#E9E9E9
| 411716 ||  || — || January 10, 2008 || Mount Lemmon || Mount Lemmon Survey || — || align=right | 1.3 km || 
|-id=717 bgcolor=#E9E9E9
| 411717 Cherylreed ||  ||  || February 12, 2004 || Kitt Peak || Spacewatch || — || align=right | 1.0 km || 
|-id=718 bgcolor=#fefefe
| 411718 ||  || — || August 12, 2010 || Kitt Peak || Spacewatch || V || align=right data-sort-value="0.79" | 790 m || 
|-id=719 bgcolor=#fefefe
| 411719 ||  || — || November 18, 2007 || Mount Lemmon || Mount Lemmon Survey || MAS || align=right data-sort-value="0.61" | 610 m || 
|-id=720 bgcolor=#fefefe
| 411720 ||  || — || October 2, 2003 || Kitt Peak || Spacewatch || — || align=right data-sort-value="0.94" | 940 m || 
|-id=721 bgcolor=#fefefe
| 411721 ||  || — || September 11, 2007 || Mount Lemmon || Mount Lemmon Survey || — || align=right data-sort-value="0.85" | 850 m || 
|-id=722 bgcolor=#fefefe
| 411722 ||  || — || September 2, 2010 || Mount Lemmon || Mount Lemmon Survey || — || align=right data-sort-value="0.88" | 880 m || 
|-id=723 bgcolor=#fefefe
| 411723 ||  || — || February 20, 2001 || Kitt Peak || Spacewatch || MAS || align=right data-sort-value="0.77" | 770 m || 
|-id=724 bgcolor=#E9E9E9
| 411724 ||  || — || October 30, 2010 || Catalina || CSS || — || align=right | 2.7 km || 
|-id=725 bgcolor=#E9E9E9
| 411725 ||  || — || December 16, 2007 || Kitt Peak || Spacewatch || — || align=right | 2.5 km || 
|-id=726 bgcolor=#fefefe
| 411726 ||  || — || February 23, 2001 || Kitt Peak || Spacewatch || NYS || align=right data-sort-value="0.59" | 590 m || 
|-id=727 bgcolor=#fefefe
| 411727 ||  || — || March 11, 2005 || Mount Lemmon || Mount Lemmon Survey || NYS || align=right data-sort-value="0.61" | 610 m || 
|-id=728 bgcolor=#fefefe
| 411728 ||  || — || November 20, 2007 || Mount Lemmon || Mount Lemmon Survey || — || align=right data-sort-value="0.82" | 820 m || 
|-id=729 bgcolor=#E9E9E9
| 411729 ||  || — || November 18, 2006 || Kitt Peak || Spacewatch || — || align=right | 1.5 km || 
|-id=730 bgcolor=#fefefe
| 411730 ||  || — || November 7, 2007 || Mount Lemmon || Mount Lemmon Survey || — || align=right data-sort-value="0.77" | 770 m || 
|-id=731 bgcolor=#E9E9E9
| 411731 ||  || — || September 26, 2006 || Mount Lemmon || Mount Lemmon Survey || — || align=right | 1.1 km || 
|-id=732 bgcolor=#fefefe
| 411732 ||  || — || November 11, 2007 || Mount Lemmon || Mount Lemmon Survey || NYS || align=right data-sort-value="0.71" | 710 m || 
|-id=733 bgcolor=#fefefe
| 411733 ||  || — || January 16, 2001 || Kitt Peak || Spacewatch || V || align=right data-sort-value="0.76" | 760 m || 
|-id=734 bgcolor=#E9E9E9
| 411734 ||  || — || August 30, 2005 || Kitt Peak || Spacewatch || — || align=right | 2.3 km || 
|-id=735 bgcolor=#E9E9E9
| 411735 ||  || — || April 30, 2008 || Kitt Peak || Spacewatch || — || align=right | 2.1 km || 
|-id=736 bgcolor=#E9E9E9
| 411736 ||  || — || October 1, 2005 || Mount Lemmon || Mount Lemmon Survey || — || align=right | 2.4 km || 
|-id=737 bgcolor=#E9E9E9
| 411737 ||  || — || January 21, 2012 || Kitt Peak || Spacewatch || — || align=right data-sort-value="0.94" | 940 m || 
|-id=738 bgcolor=#fefefe
| 411738 ||  || — || April 2, 2005 || Kitt Peak || Spacewatch || (6769) || align=right data-sort-value="0.83" | 830 m || 
|-id=739 bgcolor=#fefefe
| 411739 ||  || — || April 7, 2005 || Kitt Peak || Spacewatch || MAS || align=right data-sort-value="0.79" | 790 m || 
|-id=740 bgcolor=#d6d6d6
| 411740 ||  || — || December 27, 2011 || Mount Lemmon || Mount Lemmon Survey || — || align=right | 3.4 km || 
|-id=741 bgcolor=#fefefe
| 411741 ||  || — || December 19, 2003 || Kitt Peak || Spacewatch || — || align=right | 1.1 km || 
|-id=742 bgcolor=#d6d6d6
| 411742 ||  || — || October 31, 2010 || Mount Lemmon || Mount Lemmon Survey || — || align=right | 2.9 km || 
|-id=743 bgcolor=#fefefe
| 411743 ||  || — || August 10, 2010 || Kitt Peak || Spacewatch || NYS || align=right data-sort-value="0.94" | 940 m || 
|-id=744 bgcolor=#E9E9E9
| 411744 ||  || — || February 13, 2004 || Kitt Peak || Spacewatch || — || align=right data-sort-value="0.84" | 840 m || 
|-id=745 bgcolor=#fefefe
| 411745 ||  || — || November 13, 2007 || Kitt Peak || Spacewatch || — || align=right data-sort-value="0.67" | 670 m || 
|-id=746 bgcolor=#fefefe
| 411746 ||  || — || September 30, 2003 || Kitt Peak || Spacewatch || MAS || align=right data-sort-value="0.64" | 640 m || 
|-id=747 bgcolor=#fefefe
| 411747 ||  || — || January 29, 2009 || Mount Lemmon || Mount Lemmon Survey || — || align=right data-sort-value="0.86" | 860 m || 
|-id=748 bgcolor=#E9E9E9
| 411748 ||  || — || December 16, 2007 || Kitt Peak || Spacewatch || BRG || align=right | 1.5 km || 
|-id=749 bgcolor=#fefefe
| 411749 ||  || — || December 20, 2004 || Mount Lemmon || Mount Lemmon Survey || — || align=right data-sort-value="0.60" | 600 m || 
|-id=750 bgcolor=#E9E9E9
| 411750 ||  || — || February 2, 2000 || Socorro || LINEAR || — || align=right | 1.2 km || 
|-id=751 bgcolor=#d6d6d6
| 411751 ||  || — || January 29, 1995 || Kitt Peak || Spacewatch || — || align=right | 2.7 km || 
|-id=752 bgcolor=#fefefe
| 411752 ||  || — || September 27, 2003 || Kitt Peak || Spacewatch || NYS || align=right data-sort-value="0.49" | 490 m || 
|-id=753 bgcolor=#E9E9E9
| 411753 ||  || — || October 22, 2006 || Kitt Peak || Spacewatch || (5) || align=right data-sort-value="0.76" | 760 m || 
|-id=754 bgcolor=#fefefe
| 411754 ||  || — || November 13, 2007 || Mount Lemmon || Mount Lemmon Survey || — || align=right | 2.0 km || 
|-id=755 bgcolor=#E9E9E9
| 411755 ||  || — || December 13, 2006 || Mount Lemmon || Mount Lemmon Survey || HOF || align=right | 2.3 km || 
|-id=756 bgcolor=#fefefe
| 411756 ||  || — || November 19, 2003 || Socorro || LINEAR || — || align=right | 1.0 km || 
|-id=757 bgcolor=#E9E9E9
| 411757 ||  || — || January 18, 2012 || Kitt Peak || Spacewatch || ADE || align=right | 2.5 km || 
|-id=758 bgcolor=#fefefe
| 411758 ||  || — || December 1, 2003 || Kitt Peak || Spacewatch || — || align=right | 2.4 km || 
|-id=759 bgcolor=#E9E9E9
| 411759 ||  || — || October 29, 2010 || Kitt Peak || Spacewatch || — || align=right | 2.2 km || 
|-id=760 bgcolor=#E9E9E9
| 411760 ||  || — || January 12, 2008 || Kitt Peak || Spacewatch || — || align=right data-sort-value="0.95" | 950 m || 
|-id=761 bgcolor=#E9E9E9
| 411761 ||  || — || January 30, 2012 || Kitt Peak || Spacewatch || — || align=right | 2.6 km || 
|-id=762 bgcolor=#E9E9E9
| 411762 ||  || — || November 23, 2006 || Mount Lemmon || Mount Lemmon Survey || — || align=right | 1.2 km || 
|-id=763 bgcolor=#d6d6d6
| 411763 ||  || — || February 17, 2007 || Kitt Peak || Spacewatch || — || align=right | 2.5 km || 
|-id=764 bgcolor=#E9E9E9
| 411764 ||  || — || November 16, 1998 || Kitt Peak || Spacewatch || — || align=right | 1.1 km || 
|-id=765 bgcolor=#fefefe
| 411765 ||  || — || November 19, 2003 || Socorro || LINEAR || — || align=right | 1.1 km || 
|-id=766 bgcolor=#E9E9E9
| 411766 ||  || — || October 8, 2010 || Kitt Peak || Spacewatch || — || align=right data-sort-value="0.93" | 930 m || 
|-id=767 bgcolor=#E9E9E9
| 411767 ||  || — || March 30, 2008 || Catalina || CSS || EUN || align=right | 1.5 km || 
|-id=768 bgcolor=#fefefe
| 411768 ||  || — || November 8, 2007 || Kitt Peak || Spacewatch || NYS || align=right data-sort-value="0.66" | 660 m || 
|-id=769 bgcolor=#E9E9E9
| 411769 ||  || — || November 2, 2010 || Mount Lemmon || Mount Lemmon Survey || — || align=right | 2.8 km || 
|-id=770 bgcolor=#fefefe
| 411770 ||  || — || December 5, 1997 || Caussols || ODAS || — || align=right data-sort-value="0.84" | 840 m || 
|-id=771 bgcolor=#E9E9E9
| 411771 ||  || — || October 29, 2010 || Mount Lemmon || Mount Lemmon Survey || — || align=right | 2.0 km || 
|-id=772 bgcolor=#E9E9E9
| 411772 ||  || — || February 22, 2004 || Kitt Peak || Spacewatch || — || align=right data-sort-value="0.82" | 820 m || 
|-id=773 bgcolor=#fefefe
| 411773 ||  || — || February 26, 2009 || Kitt Peak || Spacewatch || — || align=right data-sort-value="0.71" | 710 m || 
|-id=774 bgcolor=#E9E9E9
| 411774 ||  || — || September 23, 2005 || Kitt Peak || Spacewatch || — || align=right | 2.4 km || 
|-id=775 bgcolor=#E9E9E9
| 411775 ||  || — || March 28, 2008 || Mount Lemmon || Mount Lemmon Survey || — || align=right | 1.7 km || 
|-id=776 bgcolor=#E9E9E9
| 411776 ||  || — || January 29, 2012 || Mount Lemmon || Mount Lemmon Survey || — || align=right | 1.2 km || 
|-id=777 bgcolor=#fefefe
| 411777 ||  || — || September 30, 2003 || Kitt Peak || Spacewatch || MAS || align=right data-sort-value="0.71" | 710 m || 
|-id=778 bgcolor=#E9E9E9
| 411778 ||  || — || January 14, 2012 || Kitt Peak || Spacewatch || — || align=right | 3.1 km || 
|-id=779 bgcolor=#E9E9E9
| 411779 ||  || — || March 5, 2008 || Kitt Peak || Spacewatch || — || align=right | 1.9 km || 
|-id=780 bgcolor=#d6d6d6
| 411780 ||  || — || January 4, 2012 || Mount Lemmon || Mount Lemmon Survey || — || align=right | 2.9 km || 
|-id=781 bgcolor=#E9E9E9
| 411781 ||  || — || October 29, 2010 || Mount Lemmon || Mount Lemmon Survey || — || align=right | 1.3 km || 
|-id=782 bgcolor=#E9E9E9
| 411782 ||  || — || October 11, 2010 || Mount Lemmon || Mount Lemmon Survey || — || align=right | 1.0 km || 
|-id=783 bgcolor=#fefefe
| 411783 ||  || — || September 28, 2003 || Kitt Peak || Spacewatch || MAS || align=right data-sort-value="0.69" | 690 m || 
|-id=784 bgcolor=#d6d6d6
| 411784 ||  || — || January 30, 2012 || Kitt Peak || Spacewatch || — || align=right | 3.2 km || 
|-id=785 bgcolor=#d6d6d6
| 411785 ||  || — || April 19, 2007 || Mount Lemmon || Mount Lemmon Survey || — || align=right | 2.5 km || 
|-id=786 bgcolor=#E9E9E9
| 411786 ||  || — || February 27, 2008 || Mount Lemmon || Mount Lemmon Survey || — || align=right | 1.3 km || 
|-id=787 bgcolor=#fefefe
| 411787 ||  || — || June 19, 2010 || Mount Lemmon || Mount Lemmon Survey || — || align=right data-sort-value="0.81" | 810 m || 
|-id=788 bgcolor=#fefefe
| 411788 ||  || — || November 14, 2007 || Kitt Peak || Spacewatch || MAS || align=right data-sort-value="0.57" | 570 m || 
|-id=789 bgcolor=#E9E9E9
| 411789 ||  || — || November 19, 2006 || Kitt Peak || Spacewatch || — || align=right | 2.6 km || 
|-id=790 bgcolor=#E9E9E9
| 411790 ||  || — || October 11, 2010 || Mount Lemmon || Mount Lemmon Survey || — || align=right | 1.5 km || 
|-id=791 bgcolor=#fefefe
| 411791 ||  || — || September 30, 2003 || Kitt Peak || Spacewatch || — || align=right data-sort-value="0.87" | 870 m || 
|-id=792 bgcolor=#E9E9E9
| 411792 ||  || — || December 31, 1994 || Kitt Peak || Spacewatch || (5) || align=right data-sort-value="0.86" | 860 m || 
|-id=793 bgcolor=#fefefe
| 411793 ||  || — || November 30, 2003 || Kitt Peak || Spacewatch || — || align=right data-sort-value="0.82" | 820 m || 
|-id=794 bgcolor=#d6d6d6
| 411794 ||  || — || February 17, 2007 || Mount Lemmon || Mount Lemmon Survey || — || align=right | 2.5 km || 
|-id=795 bgcolor=#d6d6d6
| 411795 ||  || — || March 10, 2007 || Kitt Peak || Spacewatch || — || align=right | 4.1 km || 
|-id=796 bgcolor=#fefefe
| 411796 ||  || — || October 27, 2003 || Kitt Peak || Spacewatch || — || align=right data-sort-value="0.91" | 910 m || 
|-id=797 bgcolor=#fefefe
| 411797 ||  || — || January 15, 2008 || Mount Lemmon || Mount Lemmon Survey || — || align=right data-sort-value="0.79" | 790 m || 
|-id=798 bgcolor=#E9E9E9
| 411798 ||  || — || October 13, 2006 || Kitt Peak || Spacewatch || — || align=right data-sort-value="0.99" | 990 m || 
|-id=799 bgcolor=#fefefe
| 411799 ||  || — || October 9, 2007 || Kitt Peak || Spacewatch || — || align=right data-sort-value="0.75" | 750 m || 
|-id=800 bgcolor=#fefefe
| 411800 ||  || — || November 19, 2003 || Socorro || LINEAR || — || align=right | 1.1 km || 
|}

411801–411900 

|-bgcolor=#fefefe
| 411801 ||  || — || February 14, 2008 || Catalina || CSS || — || align=right | 1.1 km || 
|-id=802 bgcolor=#E9E9E9
| 411802 ||  || — || January 10, 2007 || Kitt Peak || Spacewatch || — || align=right | 2.7 km || 
|-id=803 bgcolor=#E9E9E9
| 411803 ||  || — || December 27, 2006 || Mount Lemmon || Mount Lemmon Survey || — || align=right | 2.6 km || 
|-id=804 bgcolor=#E9E9E9
| 411804 ||  || — || February 13, 2008 || Mount Lemmon || Mount Lemmon Survey || EUN || align=right | 1.3 km || 
|-id=805 bgcolor=#fefefe
| 411805 ||  || — || September 15, 2007 || Mount Lemmon || Mount Lemmon Survey || — || align=right data-sort-value="0.72" | 720 m || 
|-id=806 bgcolor=#d6d6d6
| 411806 ||  || — || May 23, 2003 || Kitt Peak || Spacewatch || — || align=right | 2.9 km || 
|-id=807 bgcolor=#fefefe
| 411807 ||  || — || August 19, 2006 || Kitt Peak || Spacewatch || NYS || align=right data-sort-value="0.76" | 760 m || 
|-id=808 bgcolor=#d6d6d6
| 411808 ||  || — || January 2, 2011 || Mount Lemmon || Mount Lemmon Survey || EOS || align=right | 2.3 km || 
|-id=809 bgcolor=#E9E9E9
| 411809 ||  || — || November 1, 2005 || Mount Lemmon || Mount Lemmon Survey || — || align=right | 2.5 km || 
|-id=810 bgcolor=#E9E9E9
| 411810 ||  || — || January 25, 2007 || Catalina || CSS || — || align=right | 2.9 km || 
|-id=811 bgcolor=#d6d6d6
| 411811 ||  || — || February 4, 2006 || Catalina || CSS || — || align=right | 4.5 km || 
|-id=812 bgcolor=#fefefe
| 411812 ||  || — || March 2, 2001 || Anderson Mesa || LONEOS || — || align=right | 1.0 km || 
|-id=813 bgcolor=#E9E9E9
| 411813 ||  || — || February 24, 2003 || Campo Imperatore || CINEOS || — || align=right | 2.7 km || 
|-id=814 bgcolor=#E9E9E9
| 411814 ||  || — || October 5, 2005 || Mount Lemmon || Mount Lemmon Survey || — || align=right | 2.1 km || 
|-id=815 bgcolor=#d6d6d6
| 411815 ||  || — || March 14, 2007 || Mount Lemmon || Mount Lemmon Survey || — || align=right | 3.0 km || 
|-id=816 bgcolor=#d6d6d6
| 411816 ||  || — || November 3, 2011 || Mount Lemmon || Mount Lemmon Survey || — || align=right | 3.6 km || 
|-id=817 bgcolor=#fefefe
| 411817 ||  || — || November 20, 2007 || Mount Lemmon || Mount Lemmon Survey || — || align=right | 1.2 km || 
|-id=818 bgcolor=#fefefe
| 411818 ||  || — || March 9, 2005 || Mount Lemmon || Mount Lemmon Survey || — || align=right data-sort-value="0.95" | 950 m || 
|-id=819 bgcolor=#d6d6d6
| 411819 ||  || — || February 23, 2012 || Kitt Peak || Spacewatch || — || align=right | 3.1 km || 
|-id=820 bgcolor=#d6d6d6
| 411820 ||  || — || September 28, 2003 || Anderson Mesa || LONEOS || — || align=right | 4.1 km || 
|-id=821 bgcolor=#E9E9E9
| 411821 ||  || — || July 27, 2009 || Kitt Peak || Spacewatch || — || align=right | 1.6 km || 
|-id=822 bgcolor=#d6d6d6
| 411822 ||  || — || March 18, 2007 || Kitt Peak || Spacewatch || — || align=right | 2.1 km || 
|-id=823 bgcolor=#E9E9E9
| 411823 ||  || — || November 6, 2010 || Mount Lemmon || Mount Lemmon Survey || — || align=right | 3.0 km || 
|-id=824 bgcolor=#E9E9E9
| 411824 ||  || — || December 13, 2006 || Mount Lemmon || Mount Lemmon Survey || — || align=right | 2.3 km || 
|-id=825 bgcolor=#d6d6d6
| 411825 ||  || — || February 22, 2012 || Kitt Peak || Spacewatch || — || align=right | 3.1 km || 
|-id=826 bgcolor=#E9E9E9
| 411826 ||  || — || October 9, 2010 || Kitt Peak || Spacewatch || — || align=right | 1.6 km || 
|-id=827 bgcolor=#d6d6d6
| 411827 ||  || — || January 22, 2006 || Mount Lemmon || Mount Lemmon Survey || — || align=right | 2.6 km || 
|-id=828 bgcolor=#E9E9E9
| 411828 ||  || — || March 27, 2004 || Kitt Peak || Spacewatch || — || align=right | 1.2 km || 
|-id=829 bgcolor=#E9E9E9
| 411829 ||  || — || March 4, 2008 || Mount Lemmon || Mount Lemmon Survey || — || align=right | 1.7 km || 
|-id=830 bgcolor=#d6d6d6
| 411830 ||  || — || December 27, 2011 || Mount Lemmon || Mount Lemmon Survey || — || align=right | 4.1 km || 
|-id=831 bgcolor=#d6d6d6
| 411831 ||  || — || February 25, 2012 || Kitt Peak || Spacewatch || — || align=right | 3.3 km || 
|-id=832 bgcolor=#d6d6d6
| 411832 ||  || — || January 19, 2012 || Kitt Peak || Spacewatch || — || align=right | 3.1 km || 
|-id=833 bgcolor=#E9E9E9
| 411833 ||  || — || February 21, 2007 || Kitt Peak || Spacewatch || — || align=right | 2.2 km || 
|-id=834 bgcolor=#d6d6d6
| 411834 ||  || — || September 11, 2004 || Kitt Peak || Spacewatch || KOR || align=right | 1.5 km || 
|-id=835 bgcolor=#E9E9E9
| 411835 ||  || — || November 11, 2010 || Kitt Peak || Spacewatch || — || align=right | 1.9 km || 
|-id=836 bgcolor=#d6d6d6
| 411836 ||  || — || February 19, 2012 || Kitt Peak || Spacewatch || — || align=right | 4.3 km || 
|-id=837 bgcolor=#d6d6d6
| 411837 ||  || — || November 17, 1999 || Kitt Peak || Spacewatch || — || align=right | 2.9 km || 
|-id=838 bgcolor=#E9E9E9
| 411838 ||  || — || March 27, 2003 || Kitt Peak || Spacewatch || — || align=right | 2.1 km || 
|-id=839 bgcolor=#E9E9E9
| 411839 ||  || — || January 28, 2007 || Kitt Peak || Spacewatch || — || align=right | 3.0 km || 
|-id=840 bgcolor=#E9E9E9
| 411840 ||  || — || November 2, 2006 || Mount Lemmon || Mount Lemmon Survey || — || align=right | 1.3 km || 
|-id=841 bgcolor=#E9E9E9
| 411841 ||  || — || November 27, 2010 || Mount Lemmon || Mount Lemmon Survey || — || align=right | 1.9 km || 
|-id=842 bgcolor=#fefefe
| 411842 ||  || — || October 2, 1999 || Kitt Peak || Spacewatch || — || align=right data-sort-value="0.83" | 830 m || 
|-id=843 bgcolor=#E9E9E9
| 411843 ||  || — || October 17, 2010 || Mount Lemmon || Mount Lemmon Survey || — || align=right | 1.5 km || 
|-id=844 bgcolor=#E9E9E9
| 411844 ||  || — || November 5, 2010 || Kitt Peak || Spacewatch || — || align=right | 1.9 km || 
|-id=845 bgcolor=#d6d6d6
| 411845 ||  || — || November 26, 2005 || Kitt Peak || Spacewatch || EOS || align=right | 2.6 km || 
|-id=846 bgcolor=#fefefe
| 411846 ||  || — || October 6, 2000 || Kitt Peak || Spacewatch || — || align=right data-sort-value="0.54" | 540 m || 
|-id=847 bgcolor=#E9E9E9
| 411847 ||  || — || March 16, 2004 || Campo Imperatore || CINEOS || — || align=right | 1.0 km || 
|-id=848 bgcolor=#E9E9E9
| 411848 ||  || — || April 6, 2008 || Kitt Peak || Spacewatch || — || align=right | 1.2 km || 
|-id=849 bgcolor=#d6d6d6
| 411849 ||  || — || September 17, 2009 || Kitt Peak || Spacewatch || — || align=right | 2.8 km || 
|-id=850 bgcolor=#fefefe
| 411850 ||  || — || December 19, 2007 || Mount Lemmon || Mount Lemmon Survey || — || align=right | 1.0 km || 
|-id=851 bgcolor=#fefefe
| 411851 ||  || — || December 5, 2007 || Catalina || CSS || — || align=right data-sort-value="0.83" | 830 m || 
|-id=852 bgcolor=#d6d6d6
| 411852 ||  || — || October 14, 2010 || Mount Lemmon || Mount Lemmon Survey || KOR || align=right | 1.4 km || 
|-id=853 bgcolor=#d6d6d6
| 411853 ||  || — || September 3, 2008 || Kitt Peak || Spacewatch || — || align=right | 4.0 km || 
|-id=854 bgcolor=#E9E9E9
| 411854 ||  || — || March 31, 2003 || Kitt Peak || Spacewatch || — || align=right | 2.9 km || 
|-id=855 bgcolor=#E9E9E9
| 411855 ||  || — || September 16, 2001 || Socorro || LINEAR || — || align=right | 2.1 km || 
|-id=856 bgcolor=#E9E9E9
| 411856 ||  || — || October 27, 2005 || Kitt Peak || Spacewatch || — || align=right | 2.4 km || 
|-id=857 bgcolor=#E9E9E9
| 411857 ||  || — || September 29, 2005 || Kitt Peak || Spacewatch || — || align=right | 1.7 km || 
|-id=858 bgcolor=#fefefe
| 411858 ||  || — || February 8, 2008 || Mount Lemmon || Mount Lemmon Survey || — || align=right data-sort-value="0.83" | 830 m || 
|-id=859 bgcolor=#d6d6d6
| 411859 ||  || — || February 21, 2007 || Mount Lemmon || Mount Lemmon Survey || KOR || align=right | 1.4 km || 
|-id=860 bgcolor=#fefefe
| 411860 ||  || — || April 16, 2001 || Anderson Mesa || LONEOS || — || align=right | 1.2 km || 
|-id=861 bgcolor=#d6d6d6
| 411861 ||  || — || August 28, 2009 || Kitt Peak || Spacewatch || — || align=right | 2.4 km || 
|-id=862 bgcolor=#fefefe
| 411862 ||  || — || January 24, 2001 || Kitt Peak || Spacewatch || MAS || align=right data-sort-value="0.68" | 680 m || 
|-id=863 bgcolor=#E9E9E9
| 411863 ||  || — || April 6, 1999 || Kitt Peak || Spacewatch || — || align=right | 1.4 km || 
|-id=864 bgcolor=#E9E9E9
| 411864 ||  || — || January 24, 2007 || Mount Lemmon || Mount Lemmon Survey || — || align=right | 1.8 km || 
|-id=865 bgcolor=#fefefe
| 411865 ||  || — || November 12, 2007 || Mount Lemmon || Mount Lemmon Survey || — || align=right data-sort-value="0.66" | 660 m || 
|-id=866 bgcolor=#d6d6d6
| 411866 ||  || — || March 20, 2007 || Mount Lemmon || Mount Lemmon Survey || — || align=right | 2.0 km || 
|-id=867 bgcolor=#d6d6d6
| 411867 ||  || — || February 23, 2007 || Kitt Peak || Spacewatch || — || align=right | 3.2 km || 
|-id=868 bgcolor=#E9E9E9
| 411868 ||  || — || July 26, 2010 || WISE || WISE || KON || align=right | 2.6 km || 
|-id=869 bgcolor=#fefefe
| 411869 ||  || — || February 24, 2008 || Mount Lemmon || Mount Lemmon Survey || — || align=right data-sort-value="0.87" | 870 m || 
|-id=870 bgcolor=#d6d6d6
| 411870 ||  || — || October 17, 2009 || Mount Lemmon || Mount Lemmon Survey || — || align=right | 2.3 km || 
|-id=871 bgcolor=#E9E9E9
| 411871 ||  || — || November 2, 2010 || Mount Lemmon || Mount Lemmon Survey || — || align=right | 1.4 km || 
|-id=872 bgcolor=#E9E9E9
| 411872 ||  || — || March 27, 2003 || Kitt Peak || Spacewatch || AGN || align=right | 1.3 km || 
|-id=873 bgcolor=#d6d6d6
| 411873 ||  || — || August 16, 2009 || Kitt Peak || Spacewatch || — || align=right | 3.4 km || 
|-id=874 bgcolor=#E9E9E9
| 411874 ||  || — || April 19, 2004 || Kitt Peak || Spacewatch || — || align=right | 1.6 km || 
|-id=875 bgcolor=#d6d6d6
| 411875 ||  || — || January 25, 2010 || WISE || WISE || — || align=right | 4.0 km || 
|-id=876 bgcolor=#E9E9E9
| 411876 ||  || — || November 18, 2006 || Mount Lemmon || Mount Lemmon Survey || MAR || align=right | 1.2 km || 
|-id=877 bgcolor=#E9E9E9
| 411877 ||  || — || March 26, 2008 || Kitt Peak || Spacewatch || — || align=right | 1.1 km || 
|-id=878 bgcolor=#d6d6d6
| 411878 ||  || — || November 14, 2010 || Mount Lemmon || Mount Lemmon Survey || — || align=right | 2.4 km || 
|-id=879 bgcolor=#d6d6d6
| 411879 ||  || — || March 4, 2012 || Mount Lemmon || Mount Lemmon Survey || — || align=right | 2.9 km || 
|-id=880 bgcolor=#E9E9E9
| 411880 ||  || — || March 9, 2008 || Kitt Peak || Spacewatch || — || align=right data-sort-value="0.84" | 840 m || 
|-id=881 bgcolor=#E9E9E9
| 411881 ||  || — || October 17, 2010 || Catalina || CSS || — || align=right | 1.8 km || 
|-id=882 bgcolor=#E9E9E9
| 411882 ||  || — || October 10, 2010 || Mount Lemmon || Mount Lemmon Survey || — || align=right | 1.8 km || 
|-id=883 bgcolor=#d6d6d6
| 411883 ||  || — || December 29, 2005 || Kitt Peak || Spacewatch || — || align=right | 2.3 km || 
|-id=884 bgcolor=#d6d6d6
| 411884 ||  || — || March 14, 2007 || Kitt Peak || Spacewatch || — || align=right | 2.7 km || 
|-id=885 bgcolor=#d6d6d6
| 411885 ||  || — || October 23, 1995 || Kitt Peak || Spacewatch || — || align=right | 2.3 km || 
|-id=886 bgcolor=#E9E9E9
| 411886 ||  || — || October 30, 2005 || Mount Lemmon || Mount Lemmon Survey || — || align=right | 1.7 km || 
|-id=887 bgcolor=#E9E9E9
| 411887 ||  || — || September 30, 2005 || Mount Lemmon || Mount Lemmon Survey || — || align=right | 2.0 km || 
|-id=888 bgcolor=#d6d6d6
| 411888 ||  || — || February 7, 2006 || Mount Lemmon || Mount Lemmon Survey || — || align=right | 2.8 km || 
|-id=889 bgcolor=#d6d6d6
| 411889 ||  || — || September 19, 2003 || Kitt Peak || Spacewatch || — || align=right | 2.8 km || 
|-id=890 bgcolor=#E9E9E9
| 411890 ||  || — || October 8, 2005 || Kitt Peak || Spacewatch || — || align=right | 2.0 km || 
|-id=891 bgcolor=#d6d6d6
| 411891 ||  || — || March 15, 2007 || Mount Lemmon || Mount Lemmon Survey || — || align=right | 3.1 km || 
|-id=892 bgcolor=#d6d6d6
| 411892 ||  || — || September 27, 2009 || Kitt Peak || Spacewatch || — || align=right | 2.5 km || 
|-id=893 bgcolor=#E9E9E9
| 411893 ||  || — || December 20, 2006 || Mount Lemmon || Mount Lemmon Survey || — || align=right | 2.2 km || 
|-id=894 bgcolor=#d6d6d6
| 411894 ||  || — || August 19, 2003 || Campo Imperatore || CINEOS || EOS || align=right | 2.2 km || 
|-id=895 bgcolor=#d6d6d6
| 411895 ||  || — || October 9, 2004 || Kitt Peak || Spacewatch || — || align=right | 3.5 km || 
|-id=896 bgcolor=#E9E9E9
| 411896 ||  || — || May 2, 2008 || Mount Lemmon || Mount Lemmon Survey || — || align=right | 1.8 km || 
|-id=897 bgcolor=#d6d6d6
| 411897 ||  || — || April 22, 2007 || Mount Lemmon || Mount Lemmon Survey || — || align=right | 2.7 km || 
|-id=898 bgcolor=#E9E9E9
| 411898 ||  || — || September 30, 2005 || Mount Lemmon || Mount Lemmon Survey || — || align=right | 2.2 km || 
|-id=899 bgcolor=#d6d6d6
| 411899 ||  || — || October 10, 2004 || Kitt Peak || Spacewatch || KOR || align=right | 1.7 km || 
|-id=900 bgcolor=#E9E9E9
| 411900 ||  || — || April 14, 2008 || Kitt Peak || Spacewatch || — || align=right | 1.3 km || 
|}

411901–412000 

|-bgcolor=#E9E9E9
| 411901 ||  || — || October 27, 2005 || Mount Lemmon || Mount Lemmon Survey || — || align=right | 2.5 km || 
|-id=902 bgcolor=#d6d6d6
| 411902 ||  || — || March 17, 1996 || Kitt Peak || Spacewatch || — || align=right | 3.4 km || 
|-id=903 bgcolor=#E9E9E9
| 411903 ||  || — || September 1, 2005 || Kitt Peak || Spacewatch || — || align=right | 1.6 km || 
|-id=904 bgcolor=#d6d6d6
| 411904 ||  || — || October 12, 1993 || Kitt Peak || Spacewatch || EOS || align=right | 1.9 km || 
|-id=905 bgcolor=#d6d6d6
| 411905 ||  || — || October 7, 2004 || Kitt Peak || Spacewatch || — || align=right | 3.3 km || 
|-id=906 bgcolor=#d6d6d6
| 411906 ||  || — || September 21, 2003 || Kitt Peak || Spacewatch || AEG || align=right | 3.7 km || 
|-id=907 bgcolor=#d6d6d6
| 411907 ||  || — || September 17, 2009 || Mount Lemmon || Mount Lemmon Survey || VER || align=right | 2.4 km || 
|-id=908 bgcolor=#d6d6d6
| 411908 ||  || — || February 26, 2007 || Mount Lemmon || Mount Lemmon Survey || — || align=right | 2.3 km || 
|-id=909 bgcolor=#fefefe
| 411909 ||  || — || May 13, 1997 || Kitt Peak || Spacewatch || — || align=right data-sort-value="0.95" | 950 m || 
|-id=910 bgcolor=#d6d6d6
| 411910 ||  || — || March 15, 2007 || Kitt Peak || Spacewatch || BRA || align=right | 1.8 km || 
|-id=911 bgcolor=#E9E9E9
| 411911 ||  || — || April 12, 1999 || Kitt Peak || Spacewatch || — || align=right | 1.5 km || 
|-id=912 bgcolor=#E9E9E9
| 411912 ||  || — || November 13, 2010 || Mount Lemmon || Mount Lemmon Survey || — || align=right | 1.5 km || 
|-id=913 bgcolor=#E9E9E9
| 411913 ||  || — || March 9, 2007 || Kitt Peak || Spacewatch || — || align=right | 2.1 km || 
|-id=914 bgcolor=#E9E9E9
| 411914 ||  || — || April 2, 1995 || Kitt Peak || Spacewatch || — || align=right | 1.3 km || 
|-id=915 bgcolor=#E9E9E9
| 411915 ||  || — || December 15, 2010 || Mount Lemmon || Mount Lemmon Survey || — || align=right | 1.7 km || 
|-id=916 bgcolor=#d6d6d6
| 411916 ||  || — || September 16, 2003 || Kitt Peak || Spacewatch || EUP || align=right | 4.0 km || 
|-id=917 bgcolor=#d6d6d6
| 411917 ||  || — || December 1, 2005 || Kitt Peak || Spacewatch || — || align=right | 2.6 km || 
|-id=918 bgcolor=#E9E9E9
| 411918 ||  || — || November 11, 2001 || Socorro || LINEAR || HNS || align=right | 1.5 km || 
|-id=919 bgcolor=#d6d6d6
| 411919 ||  || — || January 16, 2011 || Mount Lemmon || Mount Lemmon Survey || — || align=right | 3.1 km || 
|-id=920 bgcolor=#d6d6d6
| 411920 ||  || — || August 23, 1998 || Kitt Peak || Spacewatch || EOS || align=right | 2.4 km || 
|-id=921 bgcolor=#d6d6d6
| 411921 ||  || — || September 20, 2009 || Mount Lemmon || Mount Lemmon Survey || — || align=right | 3.6 km || 
|-id=922 bgcolor=#E9E9E9
| 411922 ||  || — || August 23, 2001 || Anderson Mesa || LONEOS || HNS || align=right | 1.5 km || 
|-id=923 bgcolor=#d6d6d6
| 411923 ||  || — || February 2, 2006 || Kitt Peak || Spacewatch || — || align=right | 3.1 km || 
|-id=924 bgcolor=#E9E9E9
| 411924 ||  || — || November 6, 2005 || Mount Lemmon || Mount Lemmon Survey || — || align=right | 3.0 km || 
|-id=925 bgcolor=#d6d6d6
| 411925 ||  || — || April 23, 2007 || Kitt Peak || Spacewatch || — || align=right | 5.7 km || 
|-id=926 bgcolor=#d6d6d6
| 411926 ||  || — || November 11, 2004 || Kitt Peak || Spacewatch || LIX || align=right | 4.4 km || 
|-id=927 bgcolor=#d6d6d6
| 411927 ||  || — || October 12, 1998 || Kitt Peak || Spacewatch || — || align=right | 3.2 km || 
|-id=928 bgcolor=#d6d6d6
| 411928 ||  || — || November 10, 2009 || Mount Lemmon || Mount Lemmon Survey || VER || align=right | 3.0 km || 
|-id=929 bgcolor=#d6d6d6
| 411929 ||  || — || November 9, 1993 || Kitt Peak || Spacewatch || — || align=right | 3.3 km || 
|-id=930 bgcolor=#d6d6d6
| 411930 ||  || — || March 16, 2012 || Kitt Peak || Spacewatch || 7:4 || align=right | 3.1 km || 
|-id=931 bgcolor=#d6d6d6
| 411931 ||  || — || January 23, 2006 || Catalina || CSS || LIX || align=right | 3.8 km || 
|-id=932 bgcolor=#E9E9E9
| 411932 ||  || — || October 1, 2005 || Mount Lemmon || Mount Lemmon Survey || — || align=right | 2.3 km || 
|-id=933 bgcolor=#E9E9E9
| 411933 ||  || — || September 26, 2005 || Kitt Peak || Spacewatch || — || align=right | 2.5 km || 
|-id=934 bgcolor=#d6d6d6
| 411934 ||  || — || April 18, 2007 || Kitt Peak || Spacewatch || EOS || align=right | 1.7 km || 
|-id=935 bgcolor=#d6d6d6
| 411935 ||  || — || September 29, 2008 || Kitt Peak || Spacewatch || — || align=right | 3.5 km || 
|-id=936 bgcolor=#d6d6d6
| 411936 ||  || — || March 19, 2001 || Anderson Mesa || LONEOS || TIR || align=right | 3.6 km || 
|-id=937 bgcolor=#d6d6d6
| 411937 ||  || — || October 2, 2003 || Kitt Peak || Spacewatch || VER || align=right | 3.2 km || 
|-id=938 bgcolor=#d6d6d6
| 411938 ||  || — || April 25, 2007 || Kitt Peak || Spacewatch || EOS || align=right | 1.9 km || 
|-id=939 bgcolor=#E9E9E9
| 411939 ||  || — || November 22, 2006 || Mount Lemmon || Mount Lemmon Survey || — || align=right | 1.5 km || 
|-id=940 bgcolor=#d6d6d6
| 411940 ||  || — || October 23, 2009 || Mount Lemmon || Mount Lemmon Survey || — || align=right | 2.6 km || 
|-id=941 bgcolor=#d6d6d6
| 411941 ||  || — || February 22, 2006 || Anderson Mesa || LONEOS || — || align=right | 3.2 km || 
|-id=942 bgcolor=#d6d6d6
| 411942 ||  || — || December 8, 2010 || Kitt Peak || Spacewatch || HYG || align=right | 2.8 km || 
|-id=943 bgcolor=#d6d6d6
| 411943 ||  || — || February 26, 2012 || Kitt Peak || Spacewatch || — || align=right | 3.1 km || 
|-id=944 bgcolor=#d6d6d6
| 411944 ||  || — || October 24, 2003 || Kitt Peak || Spacewatch || VER || align=right | 2.7 km || 
|-id=945 bgcolor=#E9E9E9
| 411945 ||  || — || February 10, 2007 || Catalina || CSS || — || align=right | 2.6 km || 
|-id=946 bgcolor=#d6d6d6
| 411946 ||  || — || October 22, 2003 || Kitt Peak || Spacewatch || EOS || align=right | 3.3 km || 
|-id=947 bgcolor=#d6d6d6
| 411947 ||  || — || November 17, 2004 || Campo Imperatore || CINEOS || — || align=right | 3.1 km || 
|-id=948 bgcolor=#d6d6d6
| 411948 ||  || — || November 20, 2009 || Kitt Peak || Spacewatch || 7:4 || align=right | 5.1 km || 
|-id=949 bgcolor=#d6d6d6
| 411949 ||  || — || February 24, 2006 || Catalina || CSS || — || align=right | 4.3 km || 
|-id=950 bgcolor=#d6d6d6
| 411950 ||  || — || February 1, 2006 || Kitt Peak || Spacewatch || EOS || align=right | 2.9 km || 
|-id=951 bgcolor=#d6d6d6
| 411951 ||  || — || April 25, 2007 || Kitt Peak || Spacewatch || EOS || align=right | 2.0 km || 
|-id=952 bgcolor=#d6d6d6
| 411952 ||  || — || September 6, 2008 || Catalina || CSS || EOS || align=right | 2.1 km || 
|-id=953 bgcolor=#E9E9E9
| 411953 ||  || — || January 16, 2007 || Catalina || CSS || EUN || align=right | 1.6 km || 
|-id=954 bgcolor=#E9E9E9
| 411954 ||  || — || March 31, 2003 || Anderson Mesa || LONEOS || — || align=right | 2.3 km || 
|-id=955 bgcolor=#d6d6d6
| 411955 ||  || — || May 25, 2006 || Mount Lemmon || Mount Lemmon Survey || TIR || align=right | 2.8 km || 
|-id=956 bgcolor=#d6d6d6
| 411956 ||  || — || January 8, 2010 || Mount Lemmon || Mount Lemmon Survey || — || align=right | 3.6 km || 
|-id=957 bgcolor=#d6d6d6
| 411957 ||  || — || December 10, 2004 || Kitt Peak || Spacewatch || EOS || align=right | 1.8 km || 
|-id=958 bgcolor=#d6d6d6
| 411958 ||  || — || November 22, 2009 || Catalina || CSS || — || align=right | 3.0 km || 
|-id=959 bgcolor=#d6d6d6
| 411959 ||  || — || November 27, 2009 || Mount Lemmon || Mount Lemmon Survey || — || align=right | 3.6 km || 
|-id=960 bgcolor=#d6d6d6
| 411960 ||  || — || December 11, 2004 || Kitt Peak || Spacewatch || — || align=right | 2.8 km || 
|-id=961 bgcolor=#d6d6d6
| 411961 ||  || — || September 16, 2009 || Kitt Peak || Spacewatch || — || align=right | 2.7 km || 
|-id=962 bgcolor=#E9E9E9
| 411962 ||  || — || September 17, 2009 || Mount Lemmon || Mount Lemmon Survey || — || align=right | 2.5 km || 
|-id=963 bgcolor=#d6d6d6
| 411963 ||  || — || September 21, 2008 || Mount Lemmon || Mount Lemmon Survey || — || align=right | 4.3 km || 
|-id=964 bgcolor=#d6d6d6
| 411964 ||  || — || September 5, 2008 || Kitt Peak || Spacewatch || — || align=right | 3.5 km || 
|-id=965 bgcolor=#d6d6d6
| 411965 ||  || — || November 9, 2004 || Catalina || CSS || — || align=right | 3.0 km || 
|-id=966 bgcolor=#d6d6d6
| 411966 ||  || — || November 25, 2009 || Mount Lemmon || Mount Lemmon Survey || — || align=right | 4.1 km || 
|-id=967 bgcolor=#d6d6d6
| 411967 ||  || — || September 28, 2008 || Catalina || CSS || (7605) || align=right | 3.4 km || 
|-id=968 bgcolor=#d6d6d6
| 411968 ||  || — || April 22, 2012 || Kitt Peak || Spacewatch || EOS || align=right | 2.1 km || 
|-id=969 bgcolor=#d6d6d6
| 411969 ||  || — || November 17, 2009 || Catalina || CSS || — || align=right | 4.8 km || 
|-id=970 bgcolor=#d6d6d6
| 411970 ||  || — || March 18, 2007 || Kitt Peak || Spacewatch || — || align=right | 3.1 km || 
|-id=971 bgcolor=#E9E9E9
| 411971 ||  || — || September 10, 2004 || Kitt Peak || Spacewatch || — || align=right | 2.1 km || 
|-id=972 bgcolor=#d6d6d6
| 411972 ||  || — || February 25, 2006 || Kitt Peak || Spacewatch || — || align=right | 2.5 km || 
|-id=973 bgcolor=#d6d6d6
| 411973 ||  || — || May 10, 2007 || Mount Lemmon || Mount Lemmon Survey || — || align=right | 2.9 km || 
|-id=974 bgcolor=#d6d6d6
| 411974 ||  || — || January 13, 2010 || Mount Lemmon || Mount Lemmon Survey || — || align=right | 4.5 km || 
|-id=975 bgcolor=#d6d6d6
| 411975 ||  || — || October 23, 2009 || Mount Lemmon || Mount Lemmon Survey || — || align=right | 2.4 km || 
|-id=976 bgcolor=#d6d6d6
| 411976 ||  || — || October 27, 2003 || Kitt Peak || Spacewatch || EOS || align=right | 2.2 km || 
|-id=977 bgcolor=#d6d6d6
| 411977 ||  || — || October 13, 2010 || Kitt Peak || Spacewatch || — || align=right | 3.0 km || 
|-id=978 bgcolor=#d6d6d6
| 411978 ||  || — || February 1, 2010 || WISE || WISE || — || align=right | 4.0 km || 
|-id=979 bgcolor=#E9E9E9
| 411979 ||  || — || March 8, 2003 || Anderson Mesa || LONEOS || — || align=right | 2.4 km || 
|-id=980 bgcolor=#d6d6d6
| 411980 ||  || — || May 17, 2002 || Kitt Peak || Spacewatch || — || align=right | 3.5 km || 
|-id=981 bgcolor=#d6d6d6
| 411981 ||  || — || April 9, 2006 || Mount Lemmon || Mount Lemmon Survey || — || align=right | 3.4 km || 
|-id=982 bgcolor=#E9E9E9
| 411982 ||  || — || November 6, 2005 || Mount Lemmon || Mount Lemmon Survey || — || align=right | 2.9 km || 
|-id=983 bgcolor=#d6d6d6
| 411983 ||  || — || November 5, 2003 || Anderson Mesa || LONEOS || — || align=right | 3.9 km || 
|-id=984 bgcolor=#d6d6d6
| 411984 ||  || — || October 29, 2008 || Mount Lemmon || Mount Lemmon Survey || — || align=right | 3.3 km || 
|-id=985 bgcolor=#d6d6d6
| 411985 ||  || — || March 11, 2010 || WISE || WISE || — || align=right | 4.6 km || 
|-id=986 bgcolor=#d6d6d6
| 411986 ||  || — || December 12, 2004 || Kitt Peak || Spacewatch || — || align=right | 3.5 km || 
|-id=987 bgcolor=#d6d6d6
| 411987 ||  || — || January 31, 2006 || Kitt Peak || Spacewatch || — || align=right | 2.6 km || 
|-id=988 bgcolor=#d6d6d6
| 411988 ||  || — || April 19, 2006 || Kitt Peak || Spacewatch || — || align=right | 3.8 km || 
|-id=989 bgcolor=#d6d6d6
| 411989 ||  || — || December 11, 2004 || Kitt Peak || Spacewatch || — || align=right | 3.8 km || 
|-id=990 bgcolor=#E9E9E9
| 411990 ||  || — || December 24, 2006 || Mount Lemmon || Mount Lemmon Survey || HNS || align=right | 1.5 km || 
|-id=991 bgcolor=#d6d6d6
| 411991 ||  || — || June 8, 2007 || Kitt Peak || Spacewatch || EOS || align=right | 1.8 km || 
|-id=992 bgcolor=#E9E9E9
| 411992 ||  || — || February 21, 2007 || Catalina || CSS || — || align=right | 1.8 km || 
|-id=993 bgcolor=#d6d6d6
| 411993 ||  || — || October 1, 2003 || Kitt Peak || Spacewatch || TIR || align=right | 2.9 km || 
|-id=994 bgcolor=#d6d6d6
| 411994 ||  || — || December 16, 2004 || Kitt Peak || Spacewatch || — || align=right | 3.9 km || 
|-id=995 bgcolor=#d6d6d6
| 411995 ||  || — || January 31, 2006 || Kitt Peak || Spacewatch || KOR || align=right | 4.8 km || 
|-id=996 bgcolor=#d6d6d6
| 411996 ||  || — || September 22, 2009 || Mount Lemmon || Mount Lemmon Survey || — || align=right | 4.7 km || 
|-id=997 bgcolor=#d6d6d6
| 411997 ||  || — || November 19, 2003 || Anderson Mesa || LONEOS || — || align=right | 4.3 km || 
|-id=998 bgcolor=#E9E9E9
| 411998 ||  || — || January 8, 2003 || Socorro || LINEAR || — || align=right | 1.5 km || 
|-id=999 bgcolor=#d6d6d6
| 411999 ||  || — || August 26, 2008 || Siding Spring || SSS || — || align=right | 4.9 km || 
|-id=000 bgcolor=#d6d6d6
| 412000 ||  || — || October 1, 2008 || Mount Lemmon || Mount Lemmon Survey || — || align=right | 3.7 km || 
|}

References

External links 
 Discovery Circumstances: Numbered Minor Planets (410001)–(415000) (IAU Minor Planet Center)

0411